= Rhodes =

Island in Greece

Rhodes Ρόδος
- Island and municipality
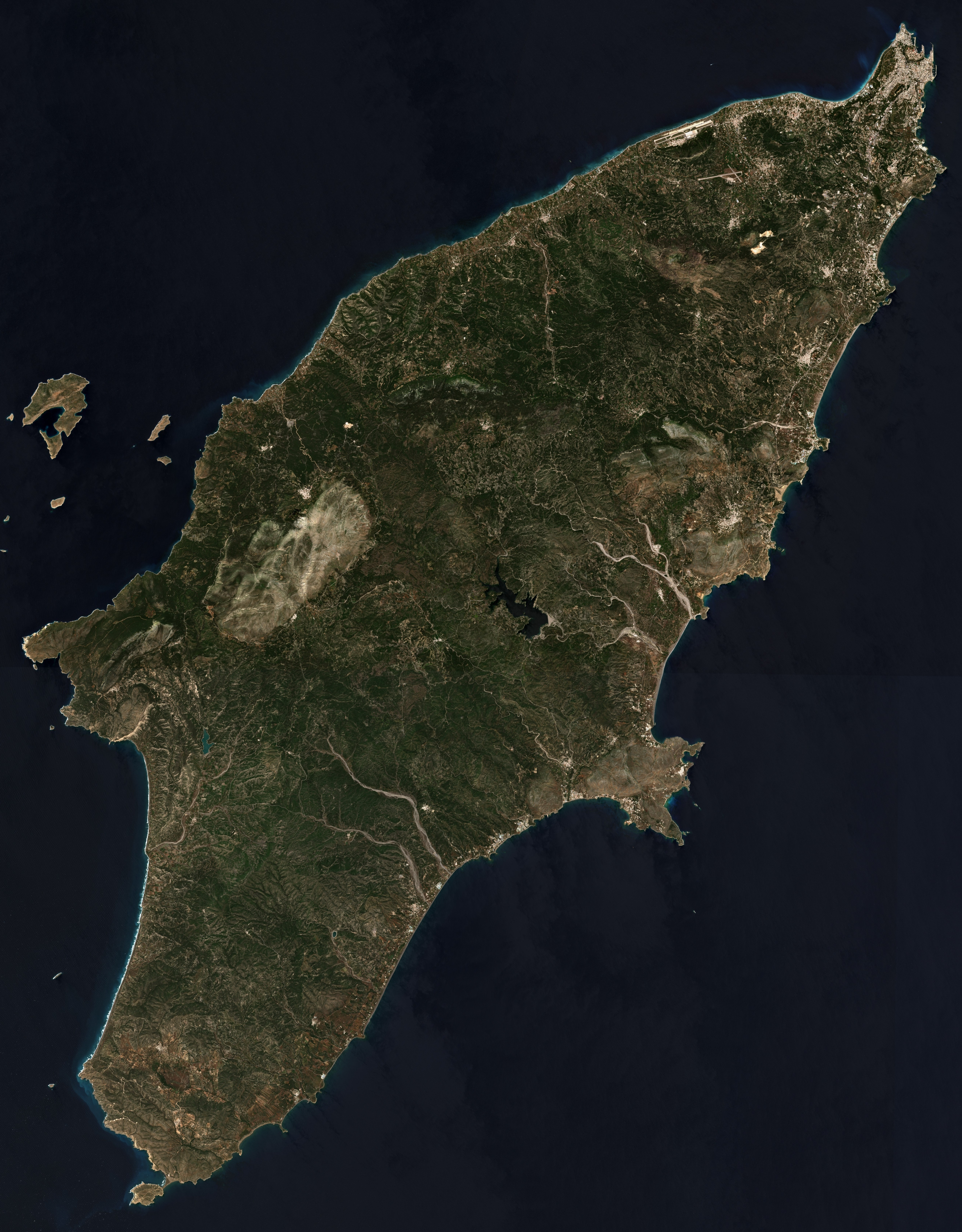

- Flag Emblem
- Nickname: Island of the Sun
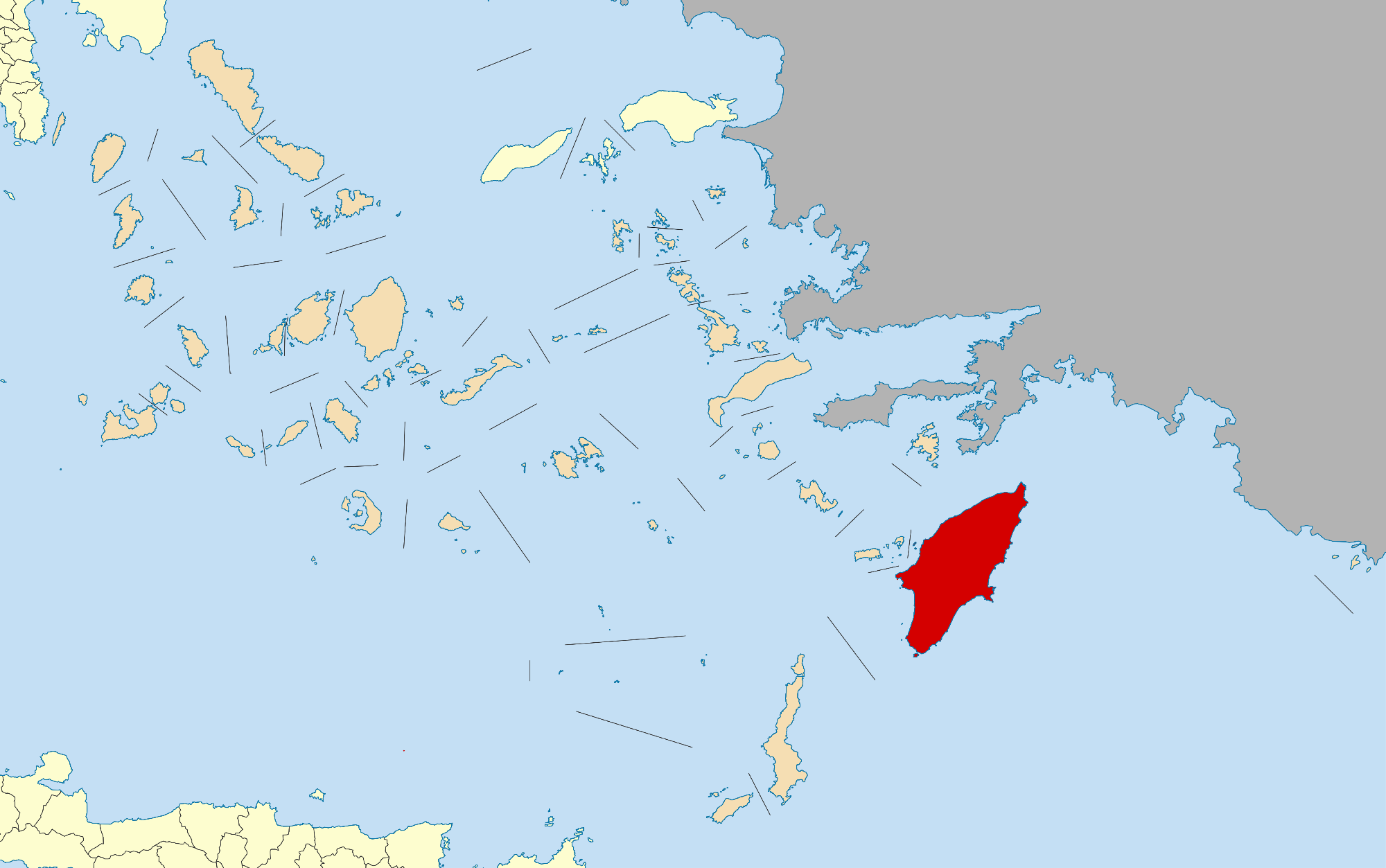
- Location in the South Aegean administrative region of Greece
- Coordinates: 36.17°N 27.92°E
- Country: Greece
- Administrative region: South Aegean
- Prefecture: Dodecanese
- Regional unit: Rhodes
- Seat: Rhodes

Government
  - Mayor: Alexandros Koliadis di Koufidis

Area
  - Total: 1,400.68 km^{2} (540.81 sq mi)
- Highest elevation (Attavyros): 1,216 m (3,990 ft)
- Lowest elevation: 0 m (0 ft)

Population (2025)
  - Total: 127,613
  - Density: 91.1079/km^{2} (235.968/sq mi)
- Demonym(s): Rhodian, Rhodiot or Rhodiote (rare)
- Time zone: UTC+2 (EET)
  - Summer (DST): UTC+3 (EEST)
- Postal codes: 851 00, 851 31, 851 32, 851 33 (for Rhodes town)
- Telephone: 2241, 2244, 2246
- Website: www.rhodes.gr

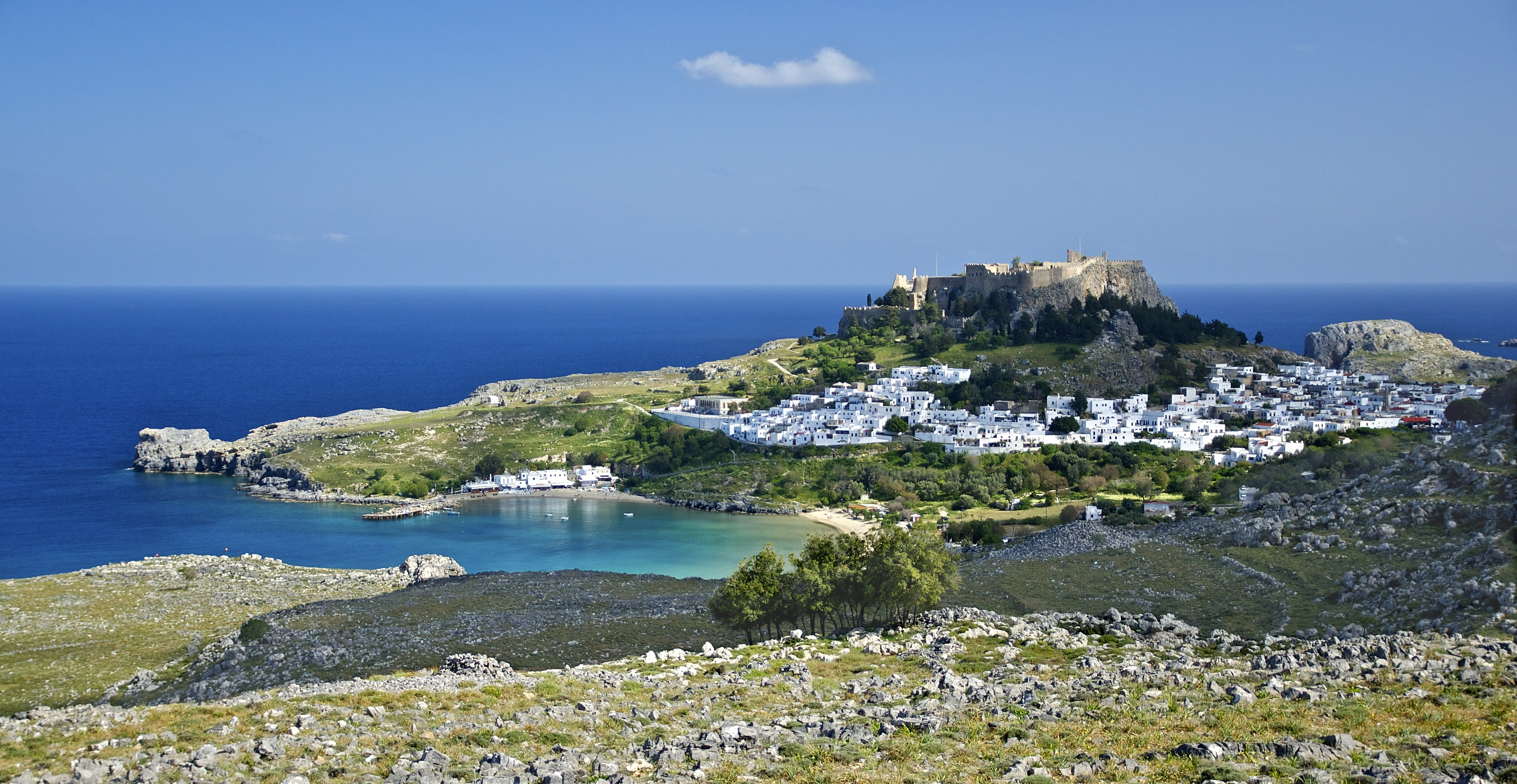
General view of the village of Lindos, with the acropolis and beaches, island of Rhodes, Greece

Rhodes (/roʊdz/; Greek: Ρόδος, romanized: Ródos [ˈroðos]) is the largest of Greece's Dodecanese islands and their historical capital, as well as the ninth largest island in the Mediterranean Sea. Administratively, Rhodes constitutes a municipality within the Rhodes regional unit, which is part of the South Aegean administrative region. The principal town of the island and seat of the municipality is the city of Rhodes, home to 50,636 inhabitants according to the 2011 census. By 2022, the island's population had grown to 125,113 people. Located northeast of Crete and southeast of Athens, Rhodes is referred to by several nicknames: "the Island of the Sun" after its patron sun god Helios; "the Pearl Island"; and "the Island of the Knights", a reference to the Knights of Saint John of Jerusalem, who ruled the island from 1310 to 1522.

Historically, Rhodes was famous for the Colossus of Rhodes, one of the Seven Wonders of the Ancient World. The medieval Old Town of the City of Rhodes has been declared a World Heritage Site. During the early 21st century the island was one of the most popular tourist destinations in Europe. It is often described as a party island, as it has more nightclubs and bars per capita than New York or Paris. Today, the island is completely overwhelmed by tourism. The sheer intensity of visitor activity routinely overwhelms its small population and limited infrastructure.

== Name ==
The island has been known as Ρόδος (Ródos) in Greek throughout its history. Similar-sounding ῥόδον (rhódon) in ancient Greek was the word for the rose, whilst in modern Greek the also similar-sounding ρόδι (ródi) or ρόιδο (róido) refers to the pomegranate. It was also called Lindos (Ancient Greek: Λίνδος). In addition, the island has been called Rodi in Italian, Rodos in Turkish, and רודי (Rodi) or רודיס (Rodes) in Ladino.

Other ancient names were Ρόδη (Rodē), Τελχινίς (Telchinis) and Ηλιάς (Helias).

The Travels of Sir John Mandeville incorrectly reports that Rhodes was formerly called "Collosus", through a conflation of the Colossus of Rhodes and Paul's Epistle to the Colossians, which refers to Colossae.

The island's name might be derived from erod, Phoenician for snake, since the island was home to many snakes in antiquity.

== History ==
=== Prehistory ===
During the Late Pleistocene, the island was inhabited by an unnamed species of dwarf elephant. The island has been inhabited by humans since at least the late Neolithic, as evidenced by remains found at Kalythies cave on the northeast of the island.

=== Early Bronze Age ===
At the end of the 3rd millennium BC, during the Early Bronze Age, major urban settlements began to develop on Rhodes, such as Asomatos, which is the earliest known urban centre on the island. Duck shaped vases found at Asomatos suggest contact with Cyprus as well as elsewhere in the Aegean region during this time.

=== Middle Bronze Age ===
==== Minoan period ====
The Minoan Civilisation established a settlement at Tiranda on the northwest of the island during the 16th century BC, presumably to facilitate trade.

=== Late Bronze Age ===
==== Mycenaean period ====
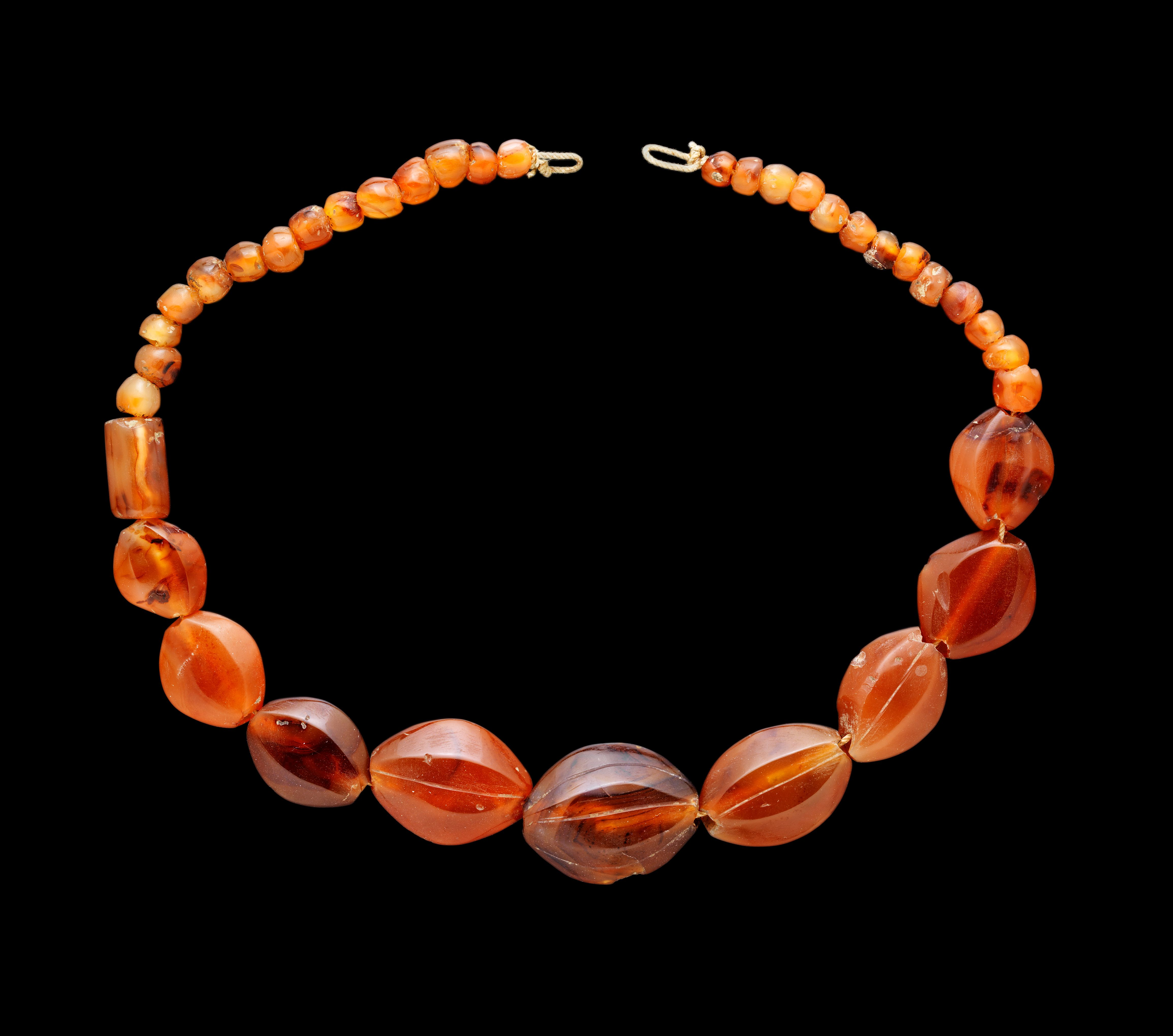
Mycenaean necklace of carnelian found in Kattavia

In the 15th century BC, Mycenaean Greeks settled. After the Bronze Age collapse, the first renewed outside contacts were with Cyprus.

In Greek legend, Rhodes was claimed to have participated in the Trojan War under the leadership of Tlepolemus.

=== Iron Age ===
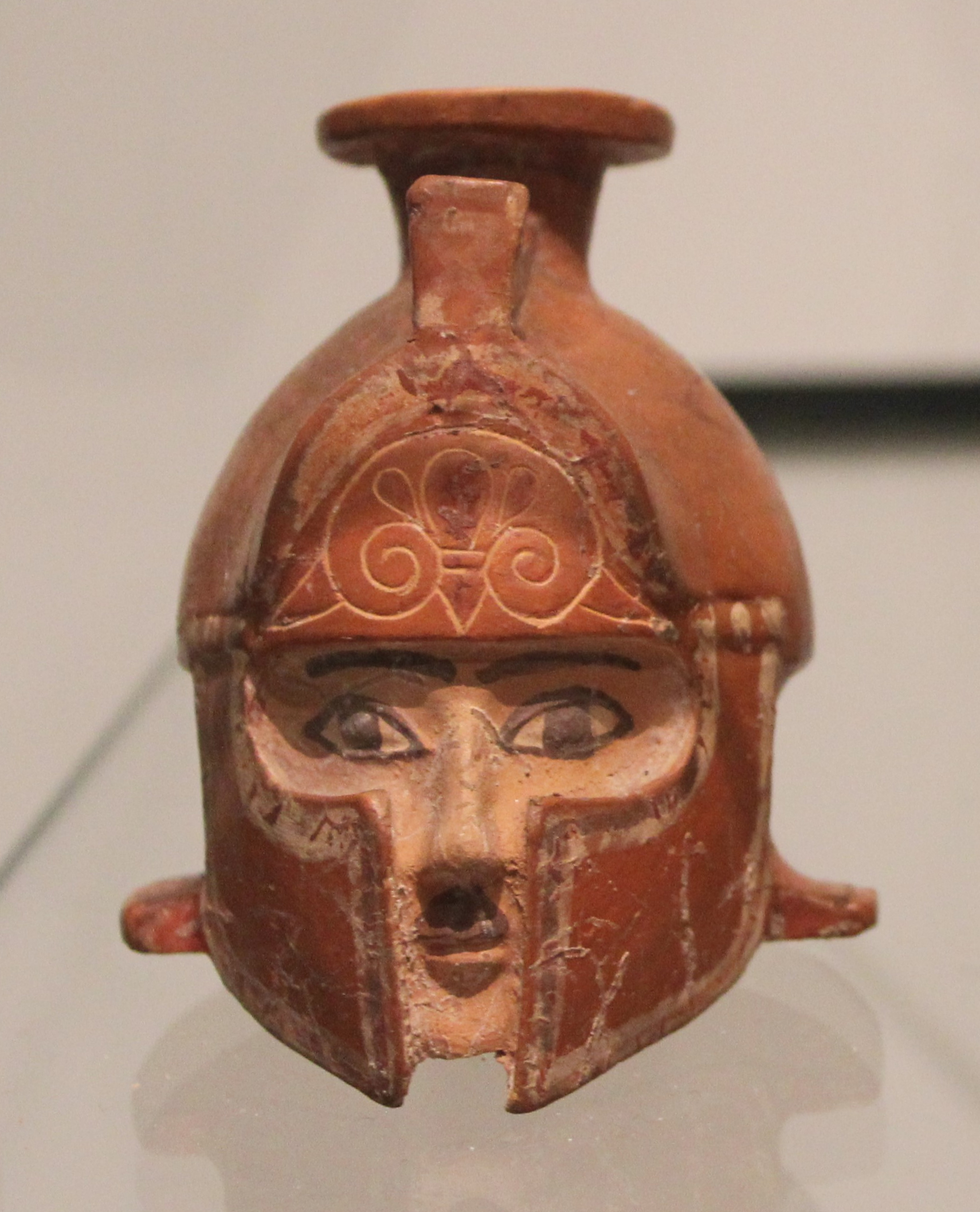
Warrior-headed vase, Camirus, Rhodes, 590–575 BC

In the 8th century BC, the island's settlements started to form, with the coming of the Dorians, who built the three important cities of Lindus, Ialysus and Camirus, which together with Kos, Cnidus and Halicarnassus (on the mainland) made up the so-called Dorian Hexapolis (Greek for six cities).

In Pindar's ode, the island was said to be born of the union of Helios the sun god and the nymph Rhodos, and the cities were named for their three sons. The rhoda is a pink hibiscus, native to the island. Diodorus Siculus added that Actis, one of the sons of Helios and Rhode, travelled to Egypt. He built the city of Heliopolis and taught the Egyptians astrology.

In the second half of the 8th century BC, the sanctuary of Athena received votive gifts that are markers for cultural contacts: small ivories from the Near East and bronze objects from Syria. At Kameiros on the northwest coast, a former Bronze Age site, At the site where the temple was established in the 8th century BC, archaeologists have identified an additional contemporaneous sequence of carved ivory figurines. The cemeteries of Kameiros and Ialyssos have also produced several notable examples of Orientalizing Rhodian jewelry, which are generally dated to the 7th and early 6th centuries BC.

=== Classical period ===
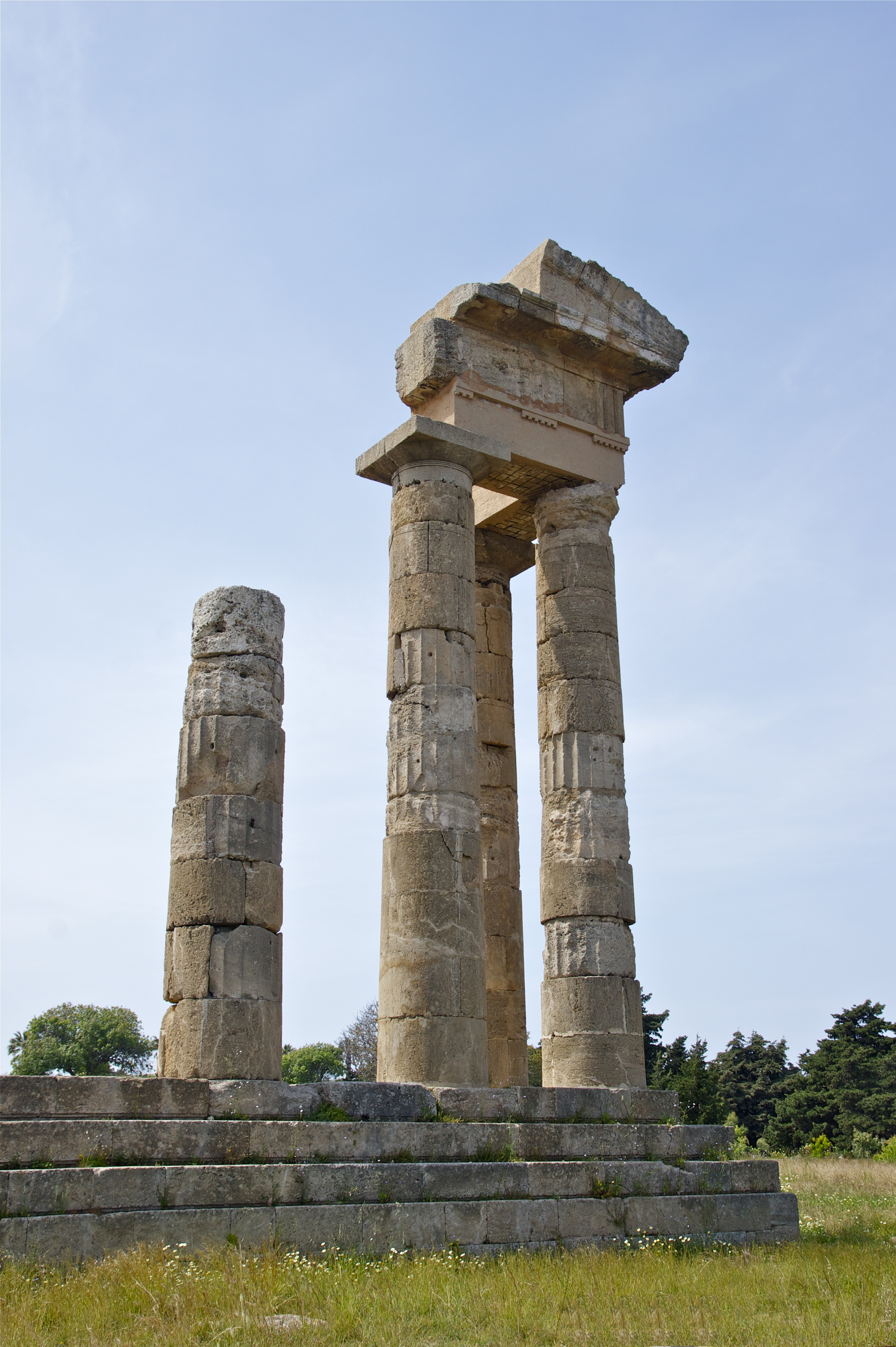
Temple of Apollo at the Acropolis of Rhodes

Being the eastern gate to the Aegean Sea, Rhodes was an important stopping point for Phoenician merchants, and prosperous trading colonies and Phoenician communities emerged there, some within the Greek cities.

The Persians invaded and overran the island, but they were in turn defeated by forces from Athens in 478 BC. The Rhodian cities joined the Athenian League. When the Peloponnesian War broke out in 431 BC, Rhodes remained largely neutral, although it remained a member of the League. The war lasted until 404 BC, but by this time Rhodes had withdrawn entirely from the conflict and decided to go their own way.

In 408 BC, the cities united to form one territory. They built the city of Rhodes, a new capital on the northern end of the island. Its regular plan was, according to Strabo, superintended by the Athenian architect Hippodamus. In 357 BC, the island was conquered by the king Mausolus of Caria; then it fell again to the Persians in 340 BC. Their rule was also short. Rhodes then became a part of the growing empire of Alexander the Great in 332 BC, after he defeated the Persians.

=== Hellenistic period ===
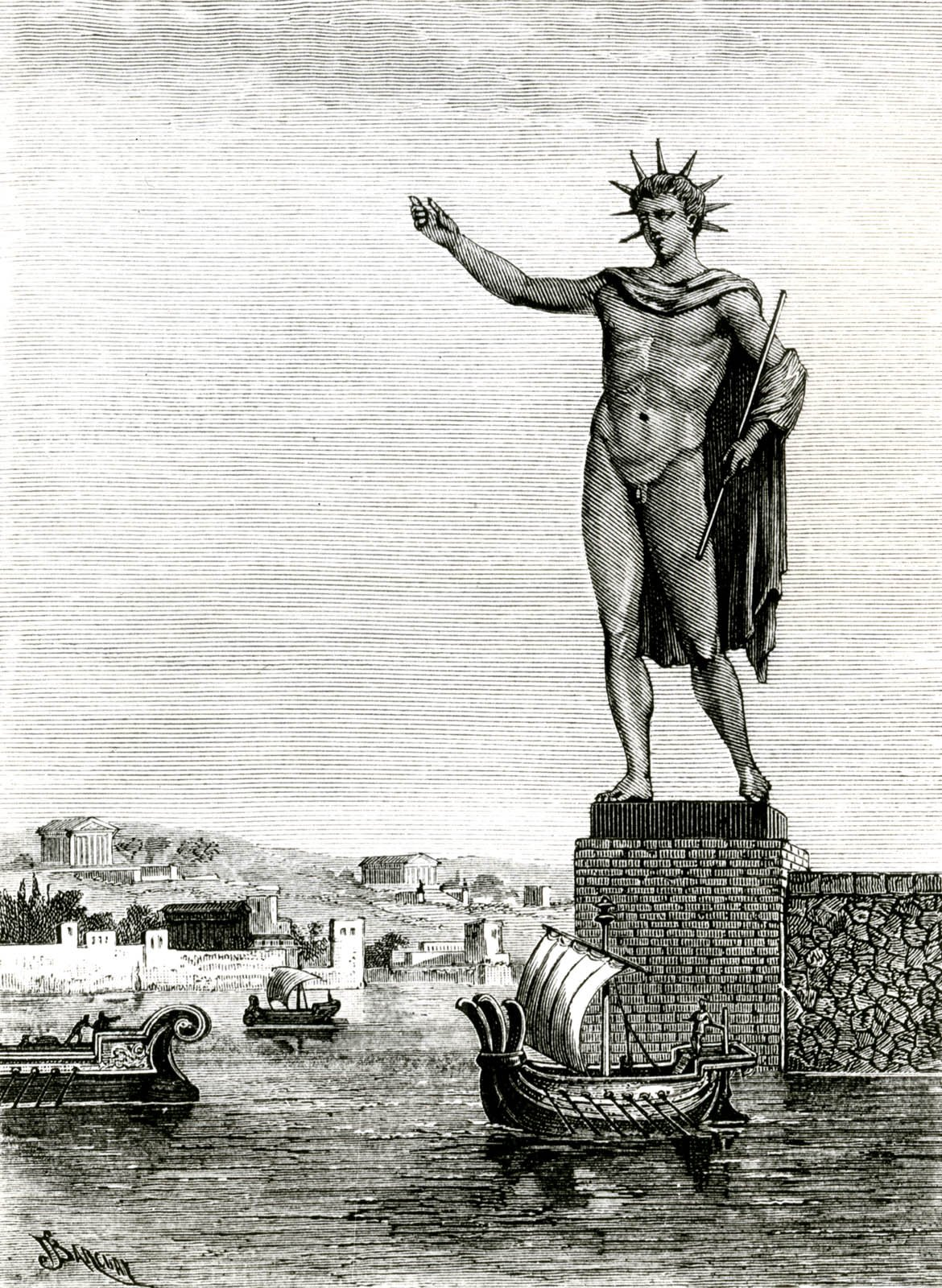
The Colossus of Rhodes, as depicted in an artist's impression of 1880

Following the death of Alexander the Great, his generals (Diadochi) vied for control of the kingdom. Three — Ptolemy, Seleucus, and Antigonus — succeeded in dividing the kingdom among themselves. Rhodes formed strong commercial and cultural ties with the Ptolemies in Alexandria, and together formed the Rhodo-Egyptian alliance that controlled trade throughout the Aegean in the 3rd century BC.

The city developed into a maritime, commercial and cultural center; its coins circulated nearly everywhere in the Mediterranean. Its famous schools of philosophy, science, literature and rhetoric shared masters with Alexandria: the Athenian rhetorician Aeschines, who formed a school at Rhodes; Apollonius of Rhodes, who wrote about Jason and Medea in the Argonautica; the observations and works of the astronomers Hipparchus and Geminus; and the rhetorician Dionysius Thrax. Its school of sculptors developed, under Pergamese influence, a rich, dramatic style that can be characterized as "Hellenistic Baroque". Agesander of Rhodes, with two other Rhodian sculptors, carved the famous Laocoön group, now in the Vatican Museums, and the large sculptures rediscovered at Sperlonga in the villa of Tiberius, probably in the early Imperial period.

In 305 BC, Antigonus directed his son, Demetrios Poliorketes, to besiege Rhodes in an attempt to break its alliance with Ptolemaic Egypt. Demetrius created huge siege engines, including a 180 ft (55 m) battering ram and a siege tower called Helepolis that weighed 360,000 lb (163,293 kg). Despite this engagement, in 304 BC after only one year, he relented and signed a peace agreement, leaving behind a huge store of military equipment. The Rhodians sold the equipment and used the money to erect a statue of their sun god, Helios, the statue since called the Colossus of Rhodes. The Rhodians celebrated in honour of Helios a grand festival, the Halieia.

Throughout the 3rd century BC, Rhodes attempted to secure its independence and commerce, particularly its virtual control over the grain trade in the eastern Mediterranean. Both of these goals depended on none of the three great Hellenistic states achieving dominance. Consequently, the Rhodians pursued a policy of maintaining a balance of power among the Antigonids, Seleucids, and Ptolemies, even if that meant going to war with its traditional ally, Ptolemaic Egypt. To this end, they employed their economy and their excellent navy as leverage, which was manned by proverbially the finest sailors in the Mediterranean world: "If we have ten Rhodians, we have ten ships."

The Rhodians also established their dominance on the shores of Caria across from their island, which became known as the "Rhodian Peraia". It extended roughly from the modern city of Muğla (ancient Mobolla) in the north and Kaunos bordering Lycia in the south, near the present-day Dalyan, Turkey.

Rhodes successfully carried on this policy through the course of the third century BC, an impressive achievement for what was essentially a democratic state. By the end of that period, however, the balance of power was crumbling, as declining Ptolemaic power made Egypt an attractive target for Seleucid ambitions. In 203/2 BC the young and dynamic kings of Antigonid Macedon and Seleucid Empire, Philip V and Antiochus III, agreed to accept—at least temporarily—their respective military ambitions: Philip's campaign in the Aegean and western Anatolia and Antiochus's plan for Egypt. Heading a coalition of small states, the Rhodians checked Philip's navy, but not his superior army. Without a third power to which to turn, the Rhodians (along with ambassadors from the kingdom of Pergamum, the Ptolemaic kingdom, and Athens) appealed in 201 BC to the Roman Republic.

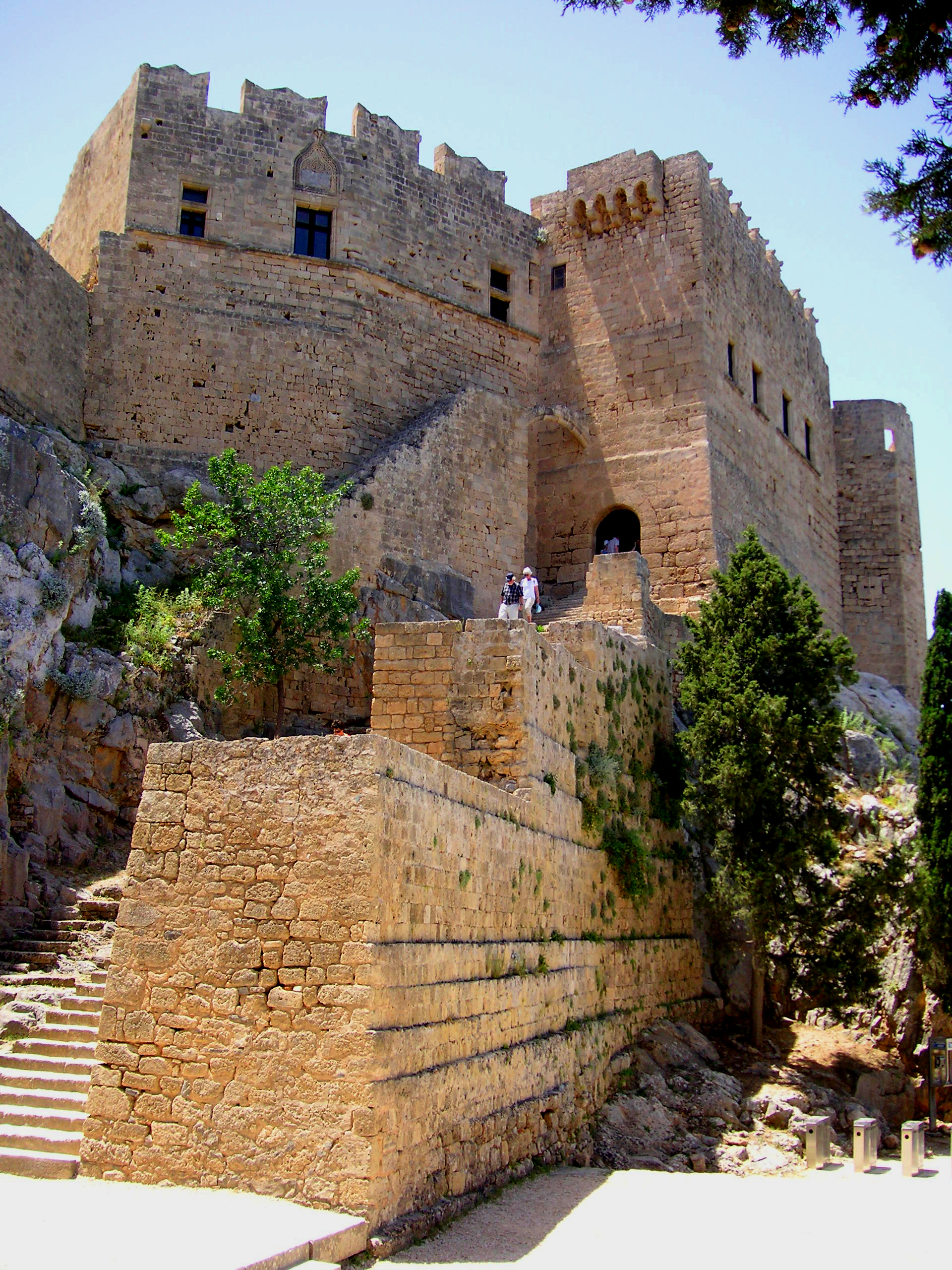
Medieval gate at the Acropolis of Lindos

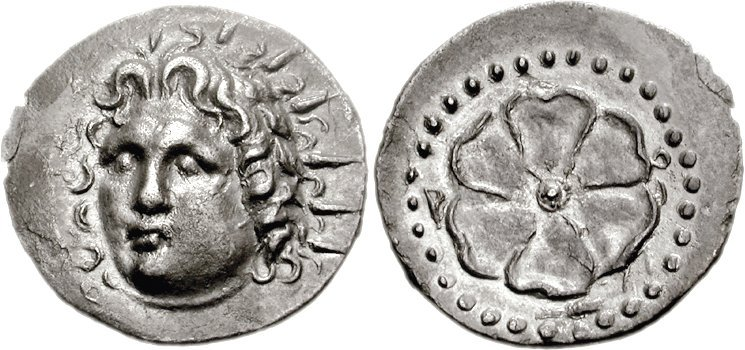
Silver drachma of Rhodes, 88/42 BC. Obverse: radiate head of Helios. Reverse: rose, "rhodon" (ῥόδον), the symbol of Rhodes.

Despite being exhausted by the Second Punic War against Hannibal (218–201 BC) the Romans agreed to intervene, still angry over the Macedonian alliance with Carthage that had led to the First Macedonian War from 214 to 205 BC. The Senate saw the appeal from Rhodes and her allies as the opportunity to pressure Philip. The result was the Second Macedonian War (200–196 BC), which Rome won and greatly reduced Macedon's power, prestige, and territory. Rhodian independence was preserved. Rhodian influence in the Aegean was cemented through the organization of the Cyclades into the Second Nesiotic League under Rhodian leadership.

The Romans withdrew from Greece after the end of the conflict, but the resulting power vacuum quickly drew in Antiochus III and subsequently the Romans. The Roman–Seleucid War lasted from 192 to 188 BC with Rome, Rhodes, Pergamon, and other Roman-allied Greek states defeated the Seleucids and their allies, the last Mediterranean power that might even vaguely threaten Roman dominance. Having provided Rome with valuable naval help in her first foray into Asia, the Rhodians were rewarded with territory and enhanced status by the Treaty of Apamea (188 BC). The Romans once again evacuated the east – the Senate preferred clients to provinces – but Roman hegemony over the Mediterranean was clear now and Rhodian autonomy was ultimately dependent upon good relations with Rome.

Those good graces soon evaporated in the wake of the Third Macedonian War (171–168 BC). In 169 BC, during the war against Perseus, Rhodes sent Agepolis as ambassador to the consul Quintus Marcius Philippus, and then to Rome in the following year, hoping to turn the Senate against the war.

Rhodes remained scrupulously neutral during the war, but in the view of hostile elements in the Senate she had been a bit too friendly with the defeated King Perseus. Some actually proposed declaring war on the island republic, but this was averted.

=== Roman period ===
In 164 BC, after several Rhodian embassies, Rome and Rhodes concluded a formal alliance. The agreement marked a significant reduction in Rhodes's freedom of action in foreign affairs and confirmed Rome's predominance in the eastern Mediterranean, although Rhodes continued to remain nominally independent. The republic remained militarily active, fighting Crete in 155–153 BC, resisting Mithridates VI in 88 BC, and later providing naval forces to Julius Caesar during the Alexandrian War.

After losing its independence, Rhodes became a cultural and educational center for Roman noble families. It was especially noted for its teachers of rhetoric, such as Hermagoras and the unknown author of Rhetorica ad Herennium. At first, the state was an important ally of Rome and enjoyed numerous privileges, but these were later lost in various machinations of Roman politics. Cassius eventually invaded the island and sacked the city in 43 BC. In the early Imperial period Rhodes became a favorite place for political exiles.

In the 1st century AD, the Emperor Tiberius spent a brief term of exile on Rhodes. By tradition, Paul the Apostle evangelized and helped establish an early Christian church on the island during the first century.

In ancient times there was a Roman saying: "Hic Rhodus, hic salta!"—"Here is Rhodes, jump here!" (as translated from Ancient Greek "Αὐτοῦ γὰρ καὶ Ῥόδος καὶ πήδημα"), an admonition to prove one's idle boasts by deed, rather than boastful talk. It comes from an Aesop's fable called "The Boasting Traveller" and was cited by Hegel, Marx, and Kierkegaard.

=== Middle Ages ===
==== Byzantine period ====
In 395 with the division of the Roman Empire, the long Byzantine period began for Rhodes. In Late Antiquity, the island was the capital of the Roman province of the Islands, headed by a praeses (hegemon in Greek), and encompassing most of the Aegean islands, with twenty cities. Correspondingly, the island was also the metropolis of the ecclesiastical province of Cyclades, with eleven suffragan sees.

Beginning from ca. 600 AD, its influence in maritime issues was manifested in the collection of maritime laws known as "Rhodian Sea Law" (Nomos Rhodion Nautikos), accepted throughout the Mediterranean and in use throughout Byzantine times (and influencing the development of admiralty law up to the present). In 622/3, during the climactic Byzantine–Sasanian War of 602–628, Rhodes was captured by the Sasanian navy.

Rhodes was occupied by the Islamic Umayyad forces of Caliph Muawiyah I in 654, who carried off the remains of the Colossus of Rhodes. The island was again captured by the Arabs in 673 as part of their first attack on Constantinople. When their fleet was destroyed by Greek fire before Constantinople and by storms on its return trip, however, the Umayyads evacuated their troops in 679/80 as part of the Byzantine–Umayyad peace treaty. In 715 the Byzantine fleet dispatched against the Arabs launched a rebellion at Rhodes, which led to the installation of Theodosios III on the Byzantine throne.

From the early 8th to the 12th centuries, Rhodes belonged to the Cibyrrhaeot Theme of the Byzantine Empire, and was a centre for shipbuilding and commerce. In c. 1090, it was occupied by the forces of the Seljuk Turks, after the long period of chaos resulting from the Battle of Manzikert. Rhodes was recaptured by the Emperor Alexios I Komnenos during the First Crusade.

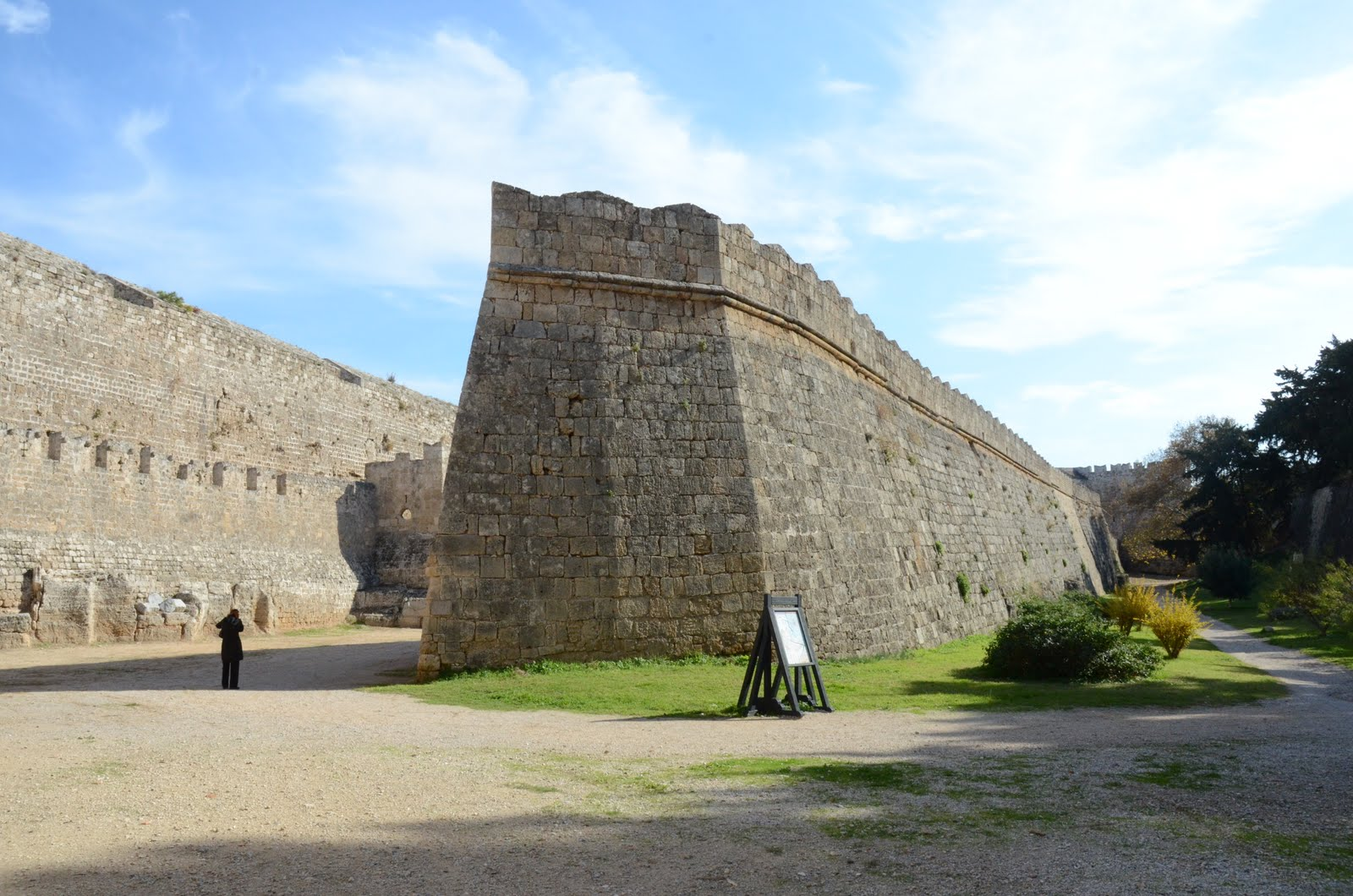
Part of the late medieval fortifications of Rhodes

As Byzantine central power weakened under the Angeloi emperors (1185–1204), in the first half of the 13th century, Rhodes became the centre of an independent domain under Leo Gabalas and his brother John, until it was occupied by the Genoese in 1248–1250. The Genoese were evicted by the Empire of Nicaea, after which the island became a regular province of the Nicaean state (and after 1261 of the restored Byzantine Empire). In 1305, the island was given as a fief to Andrea Morisco, a Genoese adventurer who had entered Byzantine service.

==== Crusader period ====
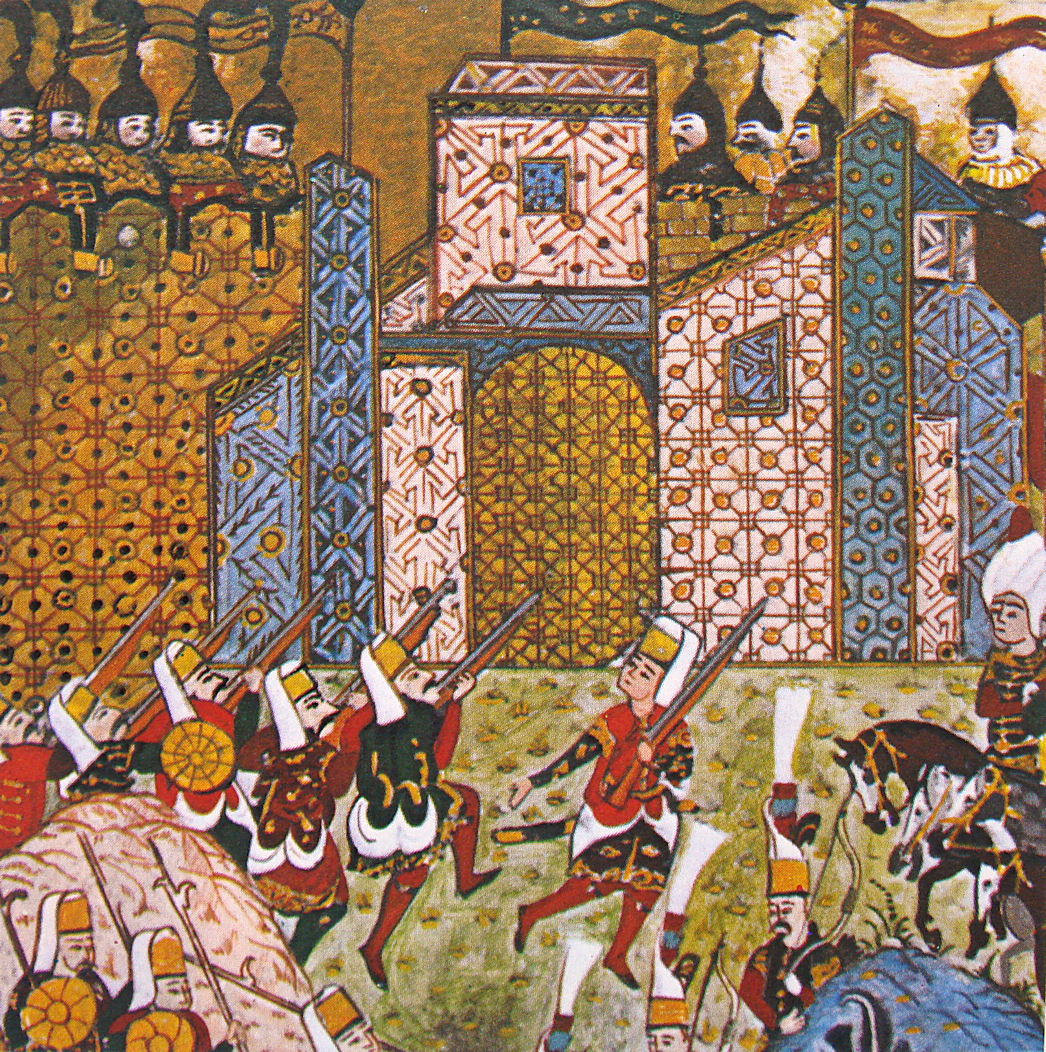
Ottoman Janissaries and defending Knights of Saint John at the Siege of Rhodes in 1522, from an Ottoman manuscript

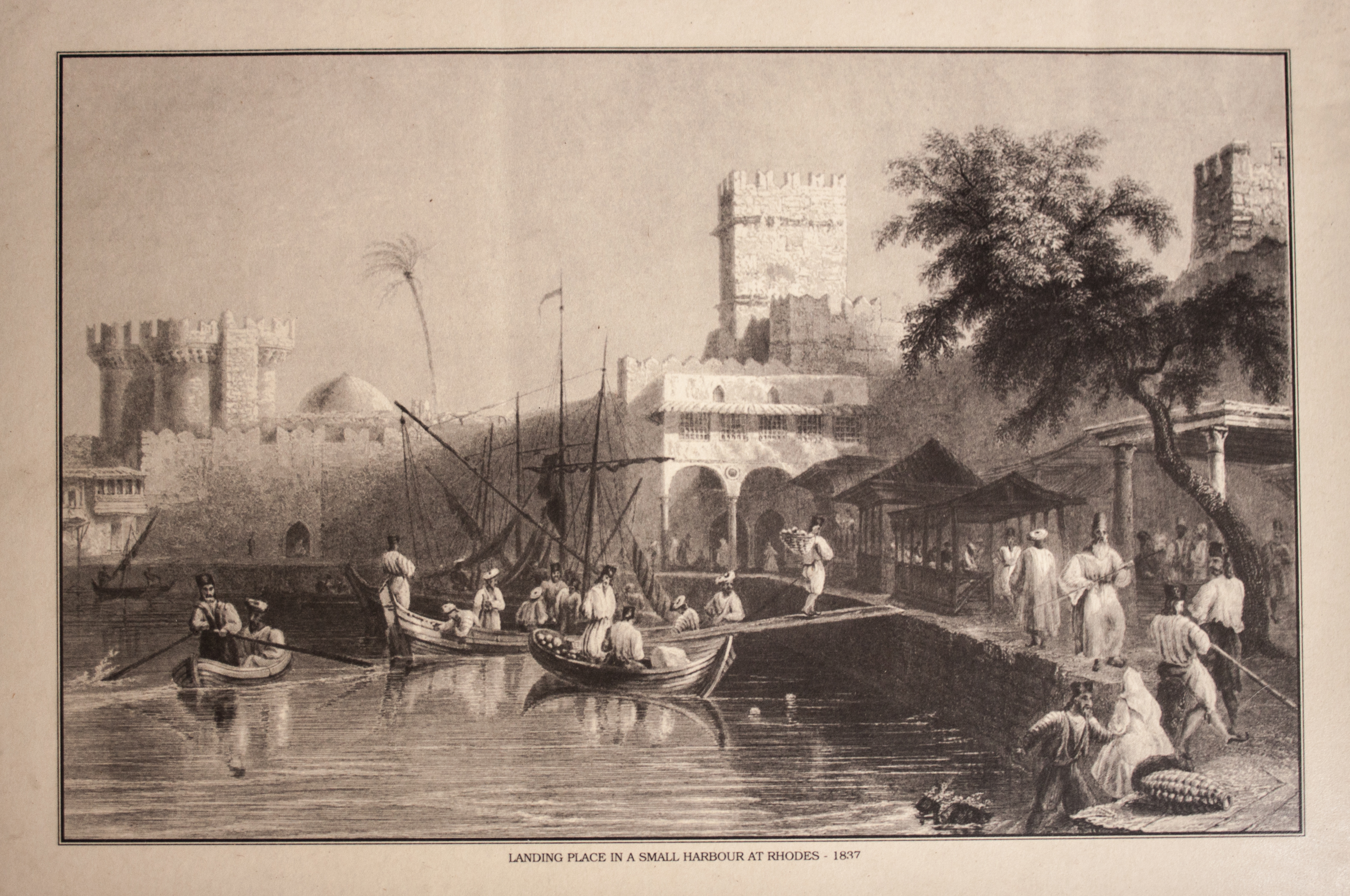
Rhodes in the 19th century

In 1306–1310, the Byzantine era of the island's history came to an end when the island was occupied by the Knights Hospitaller. Under the rule of the newly named "Knights of Rhodes", the city was rebuilt into a model of the European medieval ideal. Many of the city's famous monuments, including the Palace of the Grand Master, were built during this period.

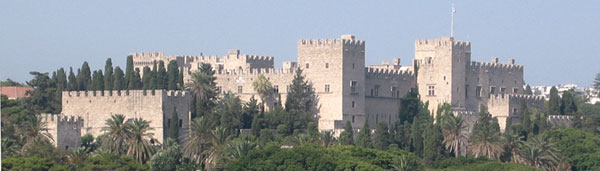
Palace of the Grand Master in the city of Rhodes

The walls had been strengthened by the Knights through hiring Italian engineers that used knowledge of ballistics to design defences against gunpowder attacks, and which withstood the attacks of the Sultan of Egypt in 1444, and a siege by the Ottomans under Mehmed II in 1480.

==== Ottoman period ====
Eventually, however, Rhodes fell to the large army of Suleiman the Magnificent in December 1522. The Sultan deployed 400 ships delivering 100,000 men to the island (200,000 in other sources). Against this force the Knights, under Grand Master Philippe Villiers de L'Isle-Adam, had about 7,000 men-at-arms, with an English, Spanish, French, and Italian contingent each defending separate areas and their fortifications. The siege lasted six months, at the end of which the surviving defeated Hospitallers were allowed to withdraw to the Kingdom of Sicily. Despite the defeat, both Christians and Muslims seem to have regarded the conduct of Villiers de L'Isle-Adam as extremely valiant, and the Grand Master was proclaimed a Defender of the Faith by Pope Adrian VI (see Knights of Cyprus and Rhodes). The knights would later move their base of operations to Malta and Gozo.

Rhodes was thereafter a possession of the Ottoman Empire (see Sanjak of Rhodes) for nearly four centuries.

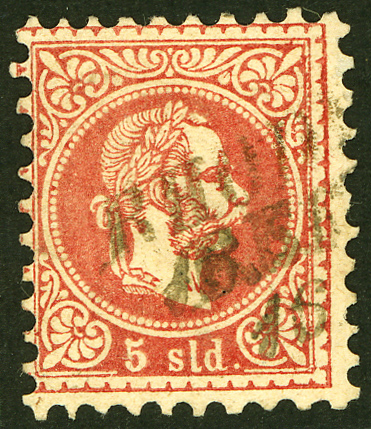
5 soldi Austrian Levant stamp cancelled in brown RHODUS.

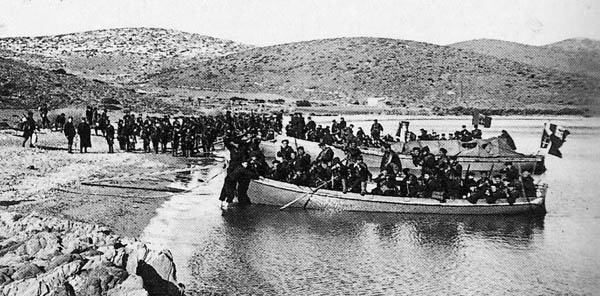
Italian landing at Rhodes on May 4, 1912, during the Italo-Turkish War

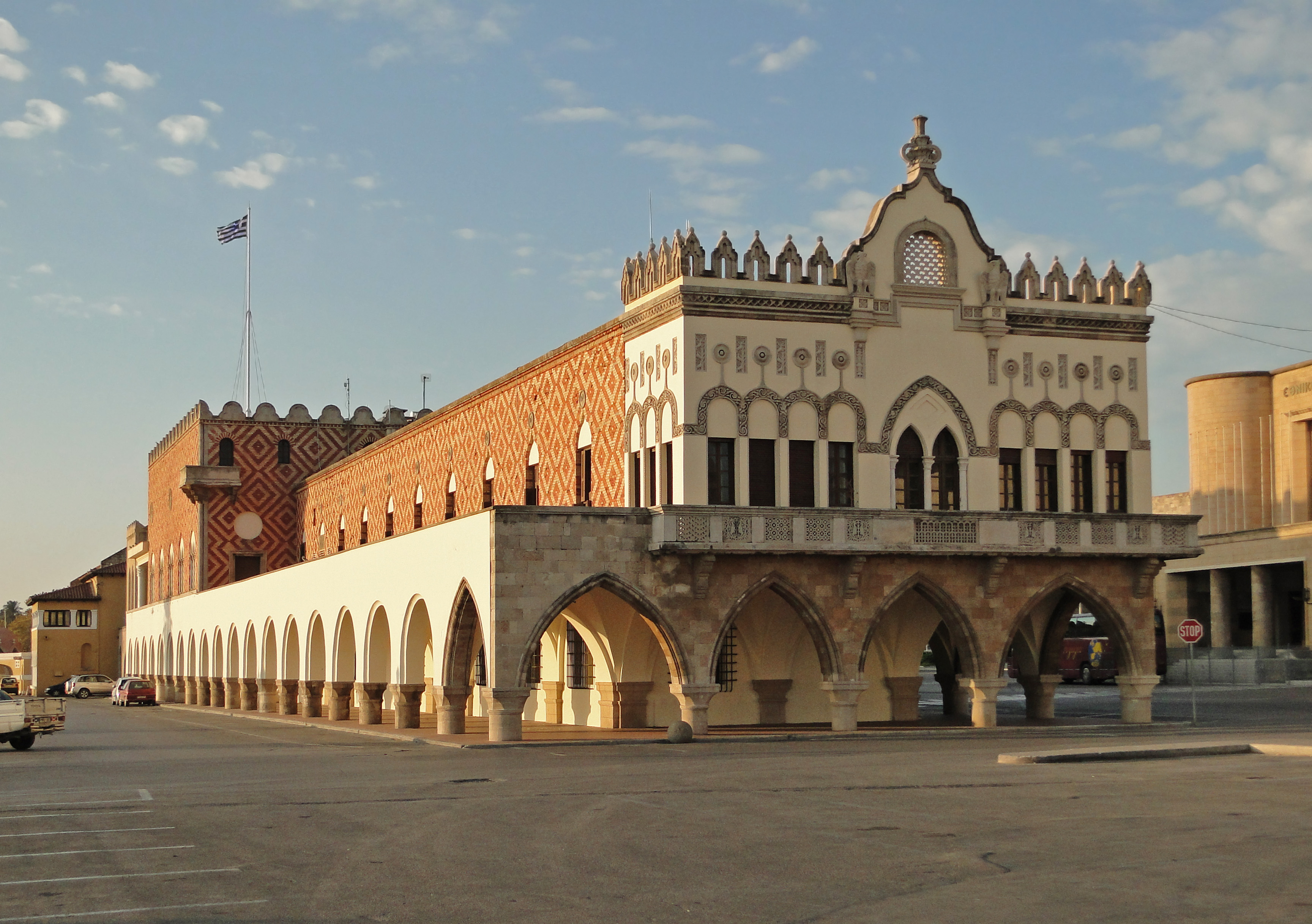
Palazzo Governale (today the offices of the Prefecture of the Dodecanese), built during the Italian period

In the 19th century the island was populated by ethnic groups from the surrounding nations, including Jews, whose presence goes back 2,300 years. Under Ottoman rule, they generally did fairly well, but discrimination and bigotry occasionally arose. In February 1840, the Jews of Rhodes were falsely accused by the Greek Orthodox community of ritually murdering a Christian boy. This became known as the Rhodes blood libel.

Austria opened a post-office at RHODUS (Venetian name) before 1864, as witnessed by stamps with Franz Joseph's head.

=== Italian period ===
In 1912, Italy seized Rhodes from the Ottomans during the Italo-Turkish War. Being under Italian administration, the island's population was thus spared the "exchange of the minorities" between Greece and Turkey. Rhodes and the rest of the Dodecanese Islands were assigned to Italy in the Treaty of Ouchy. Although the treaty stipulated that the islands were to be returned to Turkey, the advent of World War I prevented this from happening. Turkey ceded them officially to Italy with the 1923 Treaty of Lausanne. It then became the core of their possession of the Isole Italiane dell'Egeo.

Thousands of Italian colonists settled in the island, mainly in the capital "Rodi", while some of them founded farm villages (like "Peveragno Rodio" (1929), "Campochiaro" (1935), "San Marco" (1936) and "Savona" (1938): in 1940 the creation of the "Provincia italiana di Rodi" in the Dodecanese islands was officially proposed. In the late 1930s, Mussolini embarked on a program of Italianization, attempting to make the island of Rhodes a transportation hub that would facilitate the spread of Italian culture in Greece and the Levant. The Fascist program coincided with improvements to infrastructure, building imposing buildings such as the Hotel Rodon, the Puccini Theater and many administrative buildings with master architects such as Armando Bernabiti and Florestano Di Fausto. While the government worked at modernization, they also obliterated many historical buildings that did not match their ideal of a modern society.

The island had many "governors" appointed by the Italian government, during the occupation. Under their control, in 1938, the "Leggi razziali" (Racial Laws) were passed, mimicking the footsteps of the antisemitic policies promoted in other European countries. All Jews who served in the government, including the military, were forced to resign, school children were forced to abandon their studies, and all commerce that included any dealings with Jews was forbidden.

=== World War II ===
Following the Italian Armistice of 8 September 1943, the British attempted to get the Italian garrison on Rhodes to change sides. This was anticipated by the German Army, which succeeded in occupying the island with the Battle of Rhodes. In great measure, the German occupation caused the British failure in the subsequent Dodecanese Campaign.

After September 1943, the Jews were sent to concentration camps. However, the Turkish Consul Selahattin Ülkümen succeeded, at considerable risk to himself and his family, in saving 42 Jewish families, about 200 persons in total, who had Turkish citizenship or were members of Turkish citizens' families.

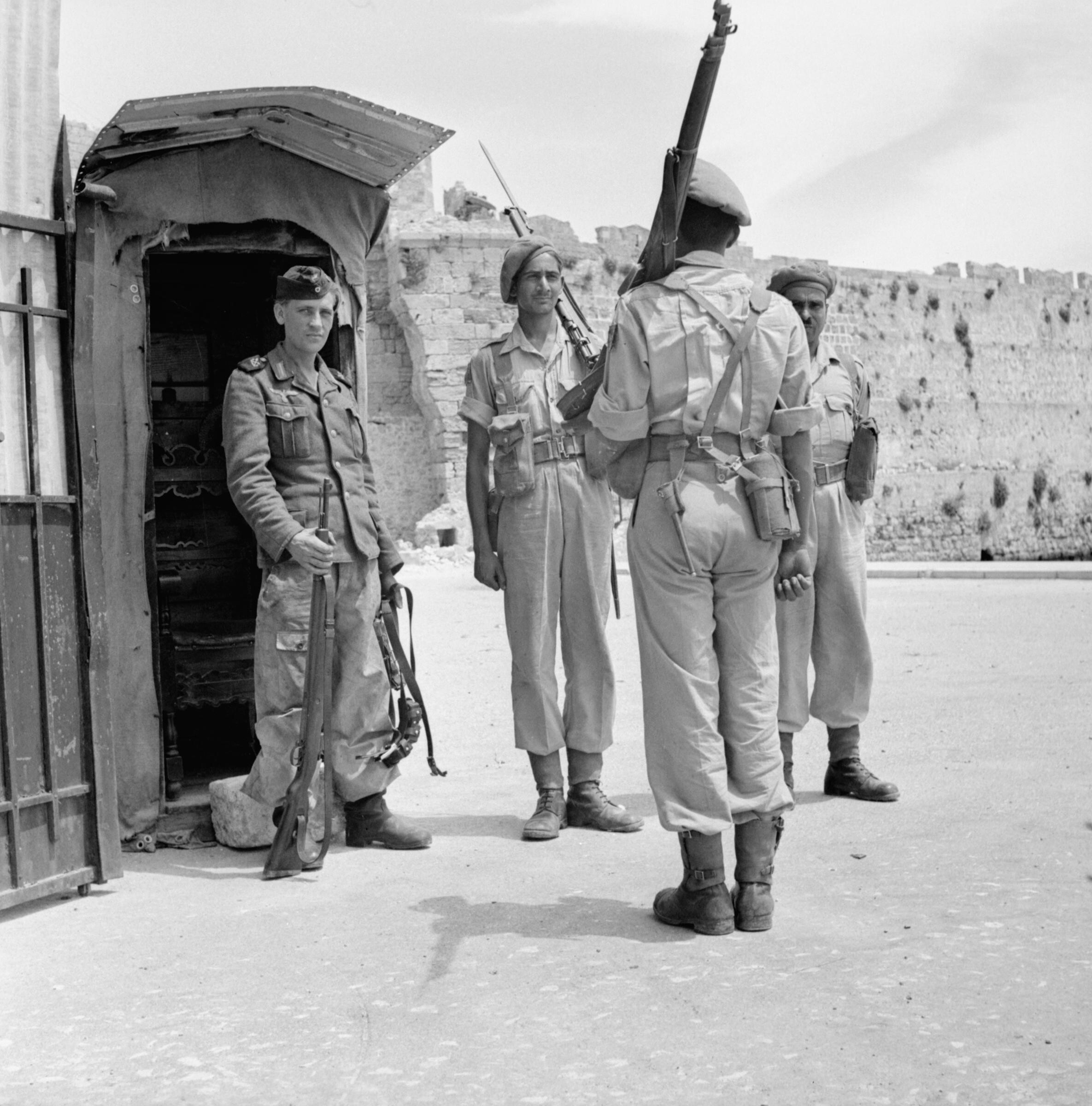
Indian soldiers taking over a sentry post from a German soldier following the German surrender in 1945

On 8 May 1945, the Germans under Otto Wagener surrendered Rhodes as well as the Dodecanese as a whole to the British, who soon after then occupied the islands as a military protectorate.

==== Contemporary period ====
At the Paris Peace Treaties, Rhodes, together with the other islands of the Dodecanese, was united with Greece in February 1947. 6,000 Italian colonists were forced to abandon the island and returned to Italy.

In 1949, Rhodes was the venue for negotiations between Israel and Egypt, Jordan, Lebanon, and Syria, concluding with the 1949 Armistice Agreements.

In 2023, the island was hit by the 2023 Greece wildfires, which forced the largest evacuations in the history of Greece. Nearly 19,000 people had to evacuate.

== Geography ==
The island of Rhodes is shaped like a spearhead, 79.7 km (49.5 mi) long and 38 km (24 mi) across at its widest, with a total area of approximately 1,400 km^{2} (541 sq mi) -much larger than the rest of the Dodecanese put together- and a coastline of approximately 220 km (137 mi). Limestone is the main bedrock. The city of Rhodes is located at the northern tip of the island, as well as the site of the ancient and modern commercial harbours. The main airport is the Diagoras International Airport (IATA code: RHO), located 14 km (9 mi) to the southwest of the city in Paradisi. The road network radiates from the city along the east and west coasts.

Outside the city of Rhodes, the island is dotted with small villages of whitewashed homes and spa resorts, among them Faliraki, Lindos, Kremasti, Haraki, Pefkos, Archangelos, Afantou, Koskinou, Embona (Attavyros), Paradisi, and Trianta (Ialysos).

Rhodes is situated 363 km (226 mi) east-southeast from the Greek mainland, and 18 km (11 mi) from the southern shore of Turkey. Mount Attavyros, at 1,216 m (3,990 ft), is the island's highest point of elevation.

=== Flora ===
The interior of the island is mountainous, sparsely inhabited and covered with forests of pine (Pinus brutia) and cypress (Cupressus sempervirens). While the shores are rocky, the island has arable strips of land where citrus fruit, wine grapes, vegetables, olives and other crops are grown. Many flowering plants for which the island is named are abundant.

=== Fauna ===
The Rhodian population of fallow deer was found to be genetically distinct in 2005, and to be of urgent conservation concern. In Petaloudes Valley (Greek for "Valley of the Butterflies"), large numbers of tiger moths gather during the summer months.

=== Earthquakes ===
Earthquakes include the 226 BC earthquake that destroyed the Colossus of Rhodes; one on 3 May 1481 which destroyed much of the city of Rhodes; and one on 26 June 1926.

On 15 July 2008, Rhodes was struck by a 6.3 magnitude earthquake, causing minor damage to a few old buildings and one death.

=== Climate ===
Rhodes has a hot-summer Mediterranean climate (Csa in the Köppen climate classification) with mild winters and hot summers. The South East of the island experiences a significantly warmer climate with Lindos registering a mean annual temperature of around 22.0 °C (71.6 °F), making it the warmest area in Greece. The Rhodes International Airport in coastal Paradeisi has never dropped below 1.2 °C (34.2 °F) from 1977 when the station started its operation. The old inland Maritsa Airport has dropped as low as −4.0 °C (24.8 °F). The highest temperature ever recorded in Paradeisi was 40.2 °C (104.4 °F) while the highest temperature ever recorded on the island was 43.6 °C (110.5 °F) in Lindos. Coastal Rhodes falls in 11a hardiness zone. As Greece is one of the few remaining countries in the world to exclusively use Campbell-Stokes sunshine recorders which underestimate annual sunshine by around 200 hours, Rhodes AP is expected to have around 3400 hours of actual annual sunshine with an automatic heliograph.

Climate data for Rhodes International Airport, Paradeisi 7 m a.s.l. (1996-2026). Extremes 1977-present Climate: Hot-summer Mediterranean climate (Csa) • USDA: 11a (4.44°C)
Month	Jan	Feb	Mar	Apr	May	Jun	Jul	Aug	Sep	Oct	Nov	Dec	Year
Record high °C (°F)	21.0 (69.8)	22.6 (72.7)	27.6 (81.7)	29.6 (85.3)	34.6 (94.3)	39.4 (102.9)	38.0 (100.4)	40.2 (104.4)	35.0 (95.0)	33.0 (91.4)	28.0 (82.4)	23.4 (74.1)	40.2 (104.4)
Mean daily maximum °C (°F)	15.4 (59.7)	15.6 (60.1)	17.4 (63.3)	20.3 (68.5)	24.0 (75.2)	28.0 (82.4)	30.6 (87.1)	30.7 (87.3)	28.2 (82.8)	24.6 (76.3)	20.8 (69.4)	17.1 (62.8)	22.7 (72.9)
Daily mean °C (°F)	13.2 (55.8)	13.2 (55.8)	14.8 (58.6)	17.4 (63.3)	21.0 (69.8)	25.0 (77.0)	27.6 (81.7)	27.9 (82.2)	25.6 (78.1)	21.9 (71.4)	18.2 (64.8)	14.8 (58.6)	20.1 (68.1)
Mean daily minimum °C (°F)	10.9 (51.6)	10.8 (51.4)	12.2 (54.0)	14.5 (58.1)	18.0 (64.4)	22.1 (71.8)	24.5 (76.1)	25.1 (77.2)	23.0 (73.4)	19.3 (66.7)	15.5 (59.9)	12.4 (54.3)	17.4 (63.2)
Record low °C (°F)	1.4 (34.5)	1.2 (34.2)	1.8 (35.2)	5.8 (42.4)	11.0 (51.8)	14.4 (57.9)	17.5 (63.5)	21.0 (69.8)	17.0 (62.6)	8.8 (47.8)	6.0 (42.8)	4.0 (39.2)	1.2 (34.2)
Average rainfall mm (inches)	130.3 (5.13)	81.3 (3.20)	55.3 (2.18)	35.7 (1.41)	18.7 (0.74)	2.0 (0.08)	0.7 (0.03)	1.3 (0.05)	7.9 (0.31)	41.4 (1.63)	97.1 (3.82)	137.8 (5.43)	609.5 (24.01)
Mean monthly sunshine hours	152.6	166.8	228.7	271.3	325.7	371.4	391.8	362.8	307.7	255.6	192.4	154.2	3,181
Source: Hellenic National Meteorological Service (Sep 1996-Aug 2026), Infoclimat, Extremes from 1977, Sunshine (Jul 2000-Aug 2026)

Climate data for Rhodes Airport (Integrated Maritsa and Paradeisi climate normals)
Month	Jan	Feb	Mar	Apr	May	Jun	Jul	Aug	Sep	Oct	Nov	Dec	Year
Record high °C (°F)	22.0 (71.6)	22.6 (72.7)	27.6 (81.7)	30.6 (87.1)	34.8 (94.6)	36.2 (97.2)	39.0 (102.2)	41.2 (106.2)	35.4 (95.7)	33.2 (91.8)	28.4 (83.1)	23.4 (74.1)	41.2 (106.2)
Mean daily maximum °C (°F)	15.1 (59.2)	15.2 (59.4)	17 (63)	20.0 (68.0)	24.1 (75.4)	28.3 (82.9)	30.4 (86.7)	30.7 (87.3)	28.1 (82.6)	24.5 (76.1)	20.2 (68.4)	16.7 (62.1)	22.5 (72.6)
Daily mean °C (°F)	12.0 (53.6)	12.0 (53.6)	13.5 (56.3)	16.3 (61.3)	20.0 (68.0)	24.2 (75.6)	26.4 (79.5)	26.7 (80.1)	24.4 (75.9)	20.7 (69.3)	16.7 (62.1)	13.5 (56.3)	18.9 (66.0)
Mean daily minimum °C (°F)	9.2 (48.6)	9.1 (48.4)	10.5 (50.9)	13 (55)	16.3 (61.3)	20.4 (68.7)	22.7 (72.9)	23.2 (73.8)	21 (70)	17.4 (63.3)	13.7 (56.7)	10.8 (51.4)	15.6 (60.1)
Record low °C (°F)	−4.0 (24.8)	−1.6 (29.1)	0.2 (32.4)	5.2 (41.4)	8.6 (47.5)	12.6 (54.7)	16.8 (62.2)	17.0 (62.6)	10.6 (51.1)	7.2 (45.0)	2.4 (36.3)	1.2 (34.2)	−4.0 (24.8)
Average rainfall mm (inches)	151.8 (5.98)	101.7 (4.00)	68.9 (2.71)	29.4 (1.16)	16.4 (0.65)	1.8 (0.07)	0.3 (0.01)	0.2 (0.01)	6.3 (0.25)	56.9 (2.24)	89.6 (3.53)	152.8 (6.02)	676.1 (26.63)
Average rainy days	15.5	12.7	10.5	7.6	4.6	1.2	0.2	0.1	1.5	6.7	9.5	15.4	85.5
Average relative humidity (%)	70.1	69.1	68.7	66.5	64.4	58.5	57.6	59.9	61.4	67.5	71.4	72.4	65.6
Mean daily sunshine hours	5.0	6.0	7.0	9.0	11.0	13.0	14.0	13.0	11.0	8.0	6.0	5.0	9.0
Source 1: Hellenic National Meteorological Service (1955–2010 averages)
Source 2: NOAA (1961–1977 temperatures taken from Maritsa Airport and 1977–1990 from Rhodes International Airport), Weather Atlas (sunshine data)

Climate data for Rhodes Port 4 m a.s.l.
Month	Jan	Feb	Mar	Apr	May	Jun	Jul	Aug	Sep	Oct	Nov	Dec	Year
Record high °C (°F)	20.8 (69.4)	20.9 (69.6)	24.6 (76.3)	27.6 (81.7)	36.4 (97.5)	37.9 (100.2)	37.4 (99.3)	37.6 (99.7)	34.4 (93.9)	32.6 (90.7)	26.8 (80.2)	22.2 (72.0)	37.9 (100.2)
Mean daily maximum °C (°F)	16.1 (61.0)	16.4 (61.5)	17.3 (63.1)	20.2 (68.4)	23.9 (75.0)	27.9 (82.2)	30.9 (87.6)	30.7 (87.3)	28.6 (83.5)	25.6 (78.1)	21.9 (71.4)	18.4 (65.1)	23.2 (73.7)
Daily mean °C (°F)	14.0 (57.2)	14.3 (57.7)	15.1 (59.2)	18.0 (64.4)	21.4 (70.5)	25.3 (77.5)	28.2 (82.8)	28.4 (83.1)	26.5 (79.7)	23.4 (74.1)	19.7 (67.5)	16.3 (61.3)	20.9 (69.6)
Mean daily minimum °C (°F)	11.9 (53.4)	12.2 (54.0)	12.9 (55.2)	15.7 (60.3)	18.9 (66.0)	22.4 (72.3)	25.3 (77.5)	26.0 (78.8)	24.4 (75.9)	21.3 (70.3)	17.5 (63.5)	14.2 (57.6)	18.6 (65.4)
Record low °C (°F)	2.9 (37.2)	4.7 (40.5)	3.8 (38.8)	9.4 (48.9)	14.2 (57.6)	16.2 (61.2)	22.4 (72.3)	23.1 (73.6)	18.7 (65.7)	17.1 (62.8)	9.3 (48.7)	9.0 (48.2)	2.9 (37.2)
Average rainfall mm (inches)	113.6 (4.47)	58.5 (2.30)	44.5 (1.75)	19.2 (0.76)	6.5 (0.26)	6.3 (0.25)	0.1 (0.00)	0.3 (0.01)	14.1 (0.56)	22.3 (0.88)	89.4 (3.52)	144.1 (5.67)	518.9 (20.43)
Mean monthly sunshine hours	155.4	187.0	238.8	269.3	326.8	374.8	393.5	363.7	311.8	264.8	193.7	153.7	3,233.3
Source 1: Municipal Port Fund of South Dodecanese (January 2019 – Mar 2025)
Source 2: Sunshine Rhodes AP

Climate data for Lindos 65 m a.s.l.
Month	Jan	Feb	Mar	Apr	May	Jun	Jul	Aug	Sep	Oct	Nov	Dec	Year
Record high °C (°F)	21.9 (71.4)	24.8 (76.6)	25.9 (78.6)	32.4 (90.3)	36.2 (97.2)	43.6 (110.5)	42.7 (108.9)	43.1 (109.6)	39.8 (103.6)	37.9 (100.2)	27.2 (81.0)	22.5 (72.5)	43.6 (110.5)
Mean daily maximum °C (°F)	16.4 (61.5)	16.9 (62.4)	18.6 (65.5)	22.5 (72.5)	26.9 (80.4)	31.8 (89.2)	35.5 (95.9)	35.0 (95.0)	31.6 (88.9)	26.7 (80.1)	22.0 (71.6)	18.3 (64.9)	25.2 (77.3)
Daily mean °C (°F)	13.8 (56.8)	14.2 (57.6)	15.7 (60.3)	19.1 (66.4)	23.2 (73.8)	27.9 (82.2)	31.5 (88.7)	31.4 (88.5)	28.2 (82.8)	23.7 (74.7)	19.4 (66.9)	15.8 (60.4)	22.0 (71.6)
Mean daily minimum °C (°F)	11.3 (52.3)	11.6 (52.9)	12.8 (55.0)	15.7 (60.3)	19.5 (67.1)	24.1 (75.4)	27.6 (81.7)	27.8 (82.0)	24.8 (76.6)	20.7 (69.3)	16.7 (62.1)	13.2 (55.8)	18.8 (65.9)
Record low °C (°F)	1.1 (34.0)	3.3 (37.9)	3.1 (37.6)	9.4 (48.9)	13.8 (56.8)	16.8 (62.2)	21.1 (70.0)	24.0 (75.2)	16.3 (61.3)	13.1 (55.6)	8.8 (47.8)	4.3 (39.7)	1.1 (34.0)
Average rainfall mm (inches)	107.2 (4.22)	74.5 (2.93)	45.1 (1.78)	10.8 (0.43)	11.0 (0.43)	2.5 (0.10)	1.4 (0.06)	0.04 (0.00)	6.1 (0.24)	22.5 (0.89)	77.0 (3.03)	123.9 (4.88)	482.04 (18.99)
Source 1: National Observatory of Athens (May 2014 – Feb 2025)
Source 2: World Meteorological Organization

Sea temperature for Rhodes
Month	Jan	Feb	Mar	Apr	May	Jun	Jul	Aug	Sep	Oct	Nov	Dec	Year
Average sea temperature °C (°F)	17.9 (64.2)	17.0 (62.6)	17.1 (62.8)	17.6 (63.7)	20.1 (68.2)	23.4 (74.1)	25.9 (78.6)	27.2 (81.0)	26.7 (80.1)	23.8 (74.8)	20.9 (69.6)	18.8 (65.8)	21.4 (70.5)
Mean daily daylight hours	10.0	11.0	12.0	13.0	14.0	15.0	14.0	13.0	12.0	11.0	10.0	10.0	12.1
Average Ultraviolet index	2	3	5	7	8	10	10	9	7	5	3	2	5.9
Source: Weather Atlas

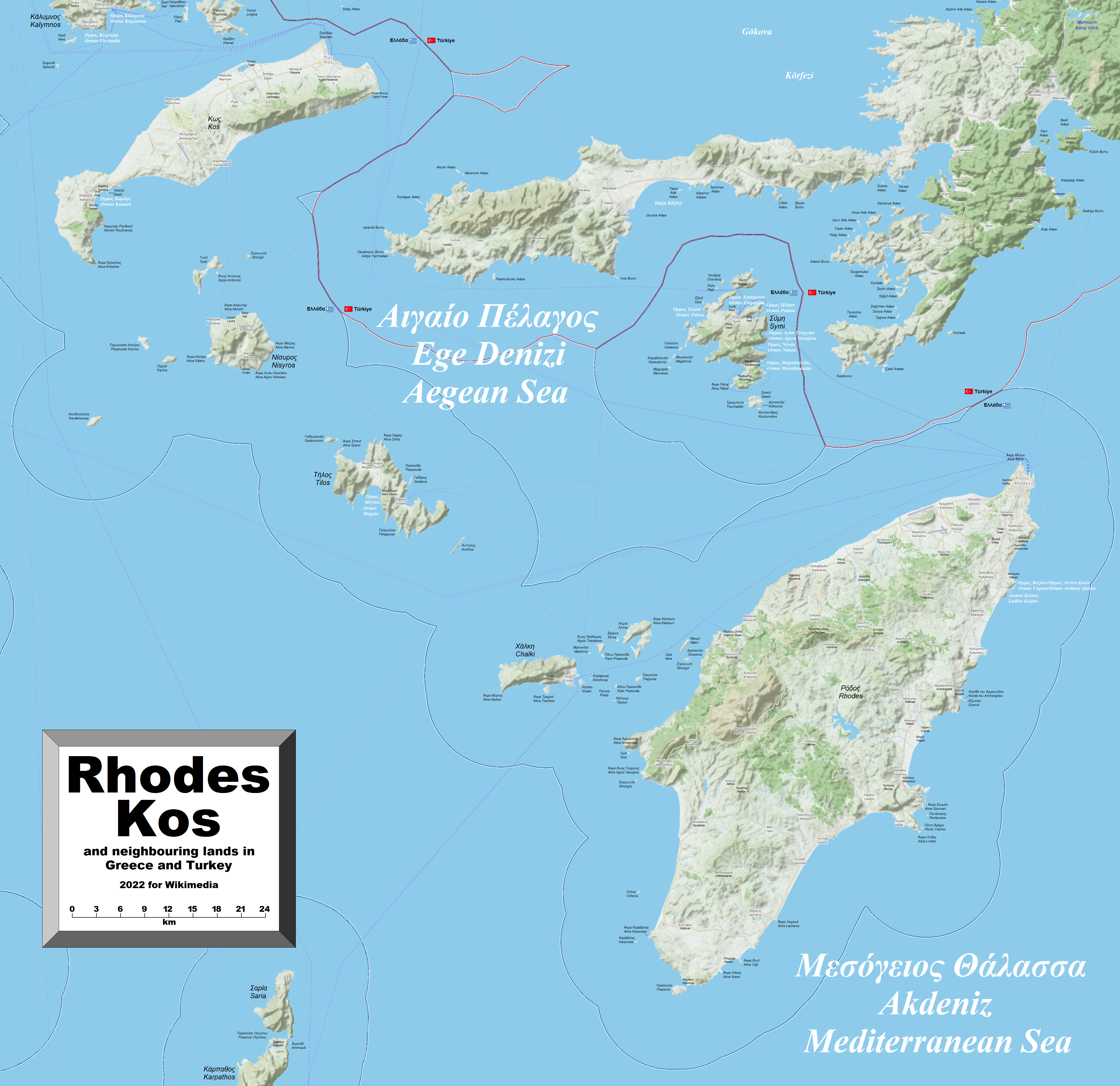
Detailed map of Rhodes, Kos and nearby lands

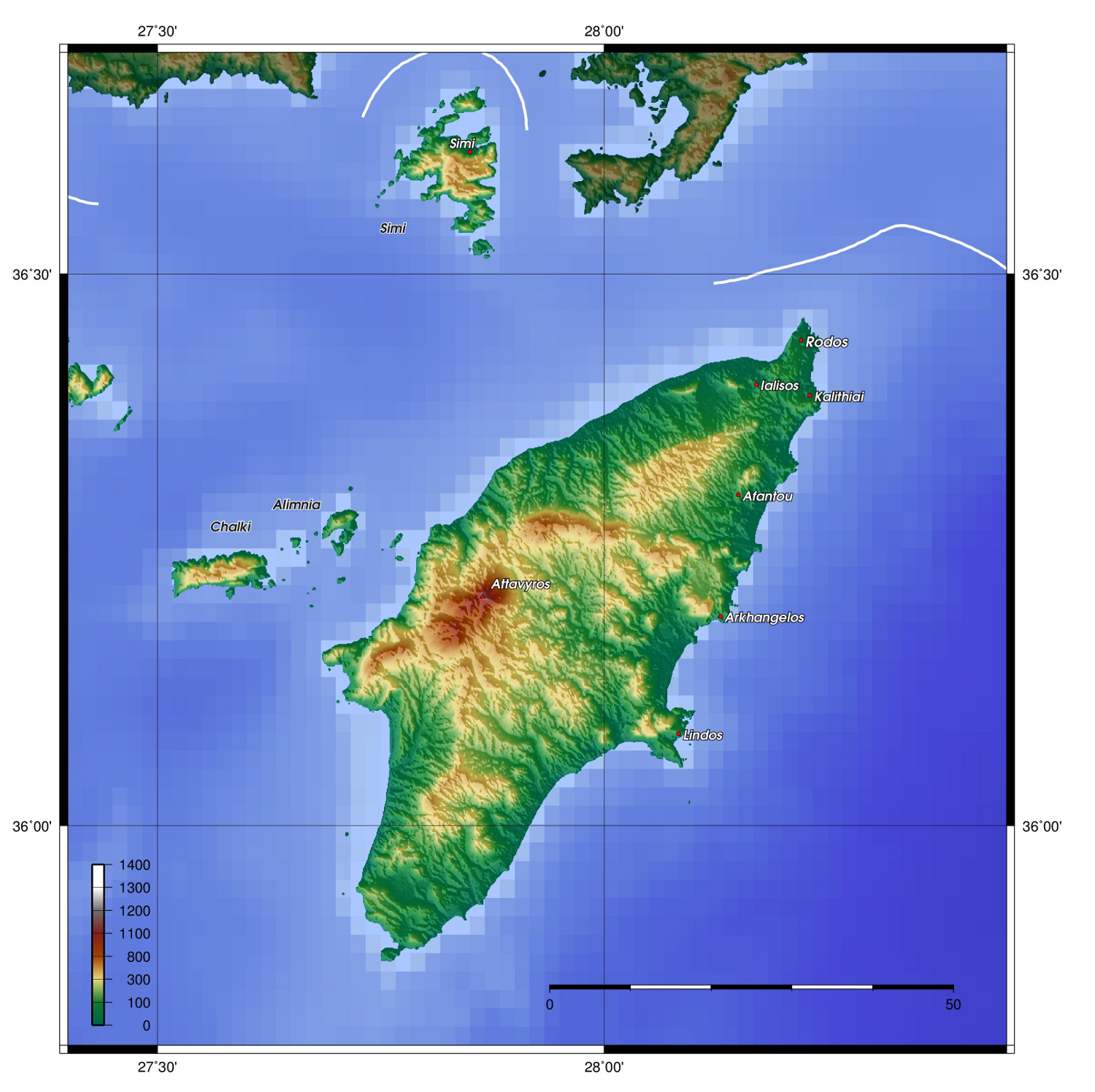
Topographic map of Rhodes

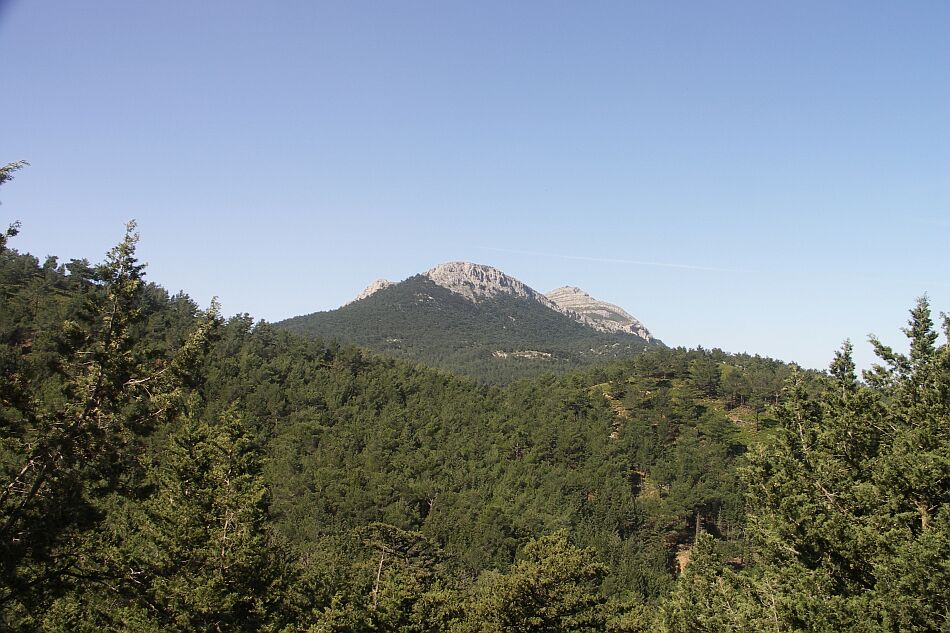
Akramitis mountain

== Archaeology ==
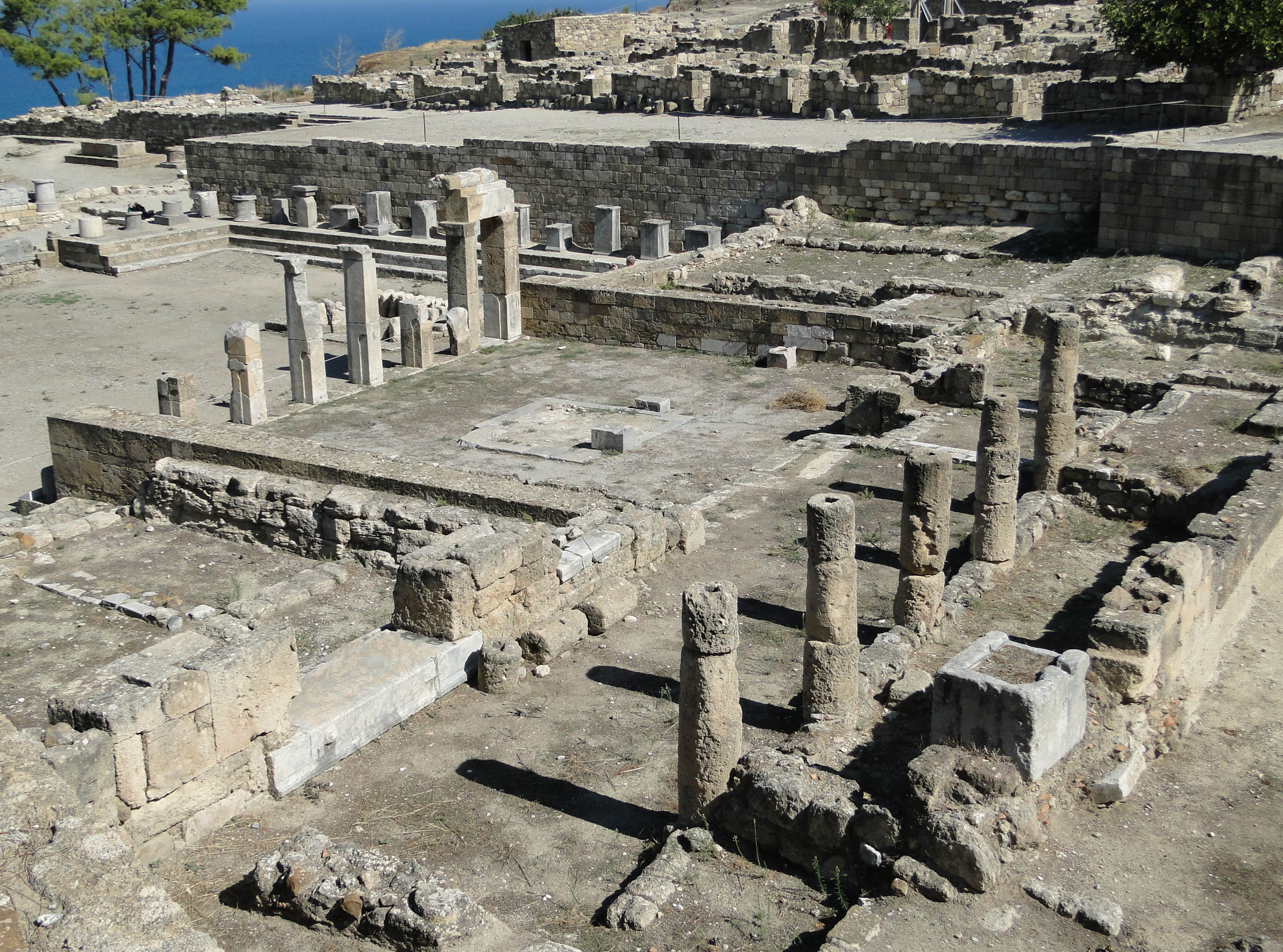
Fountain square at the ancient site of Kameiros

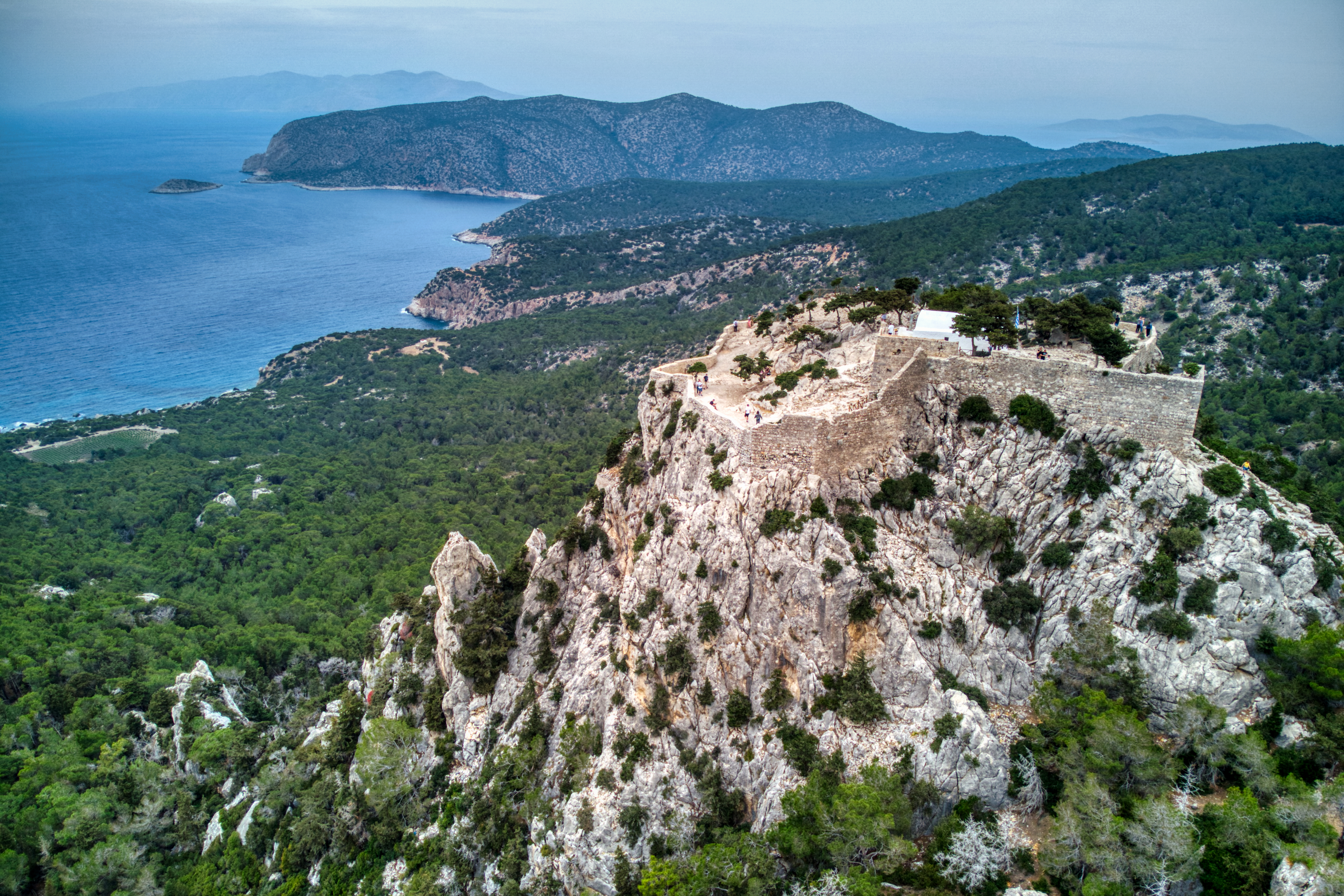
Medieval castle of Monolithos

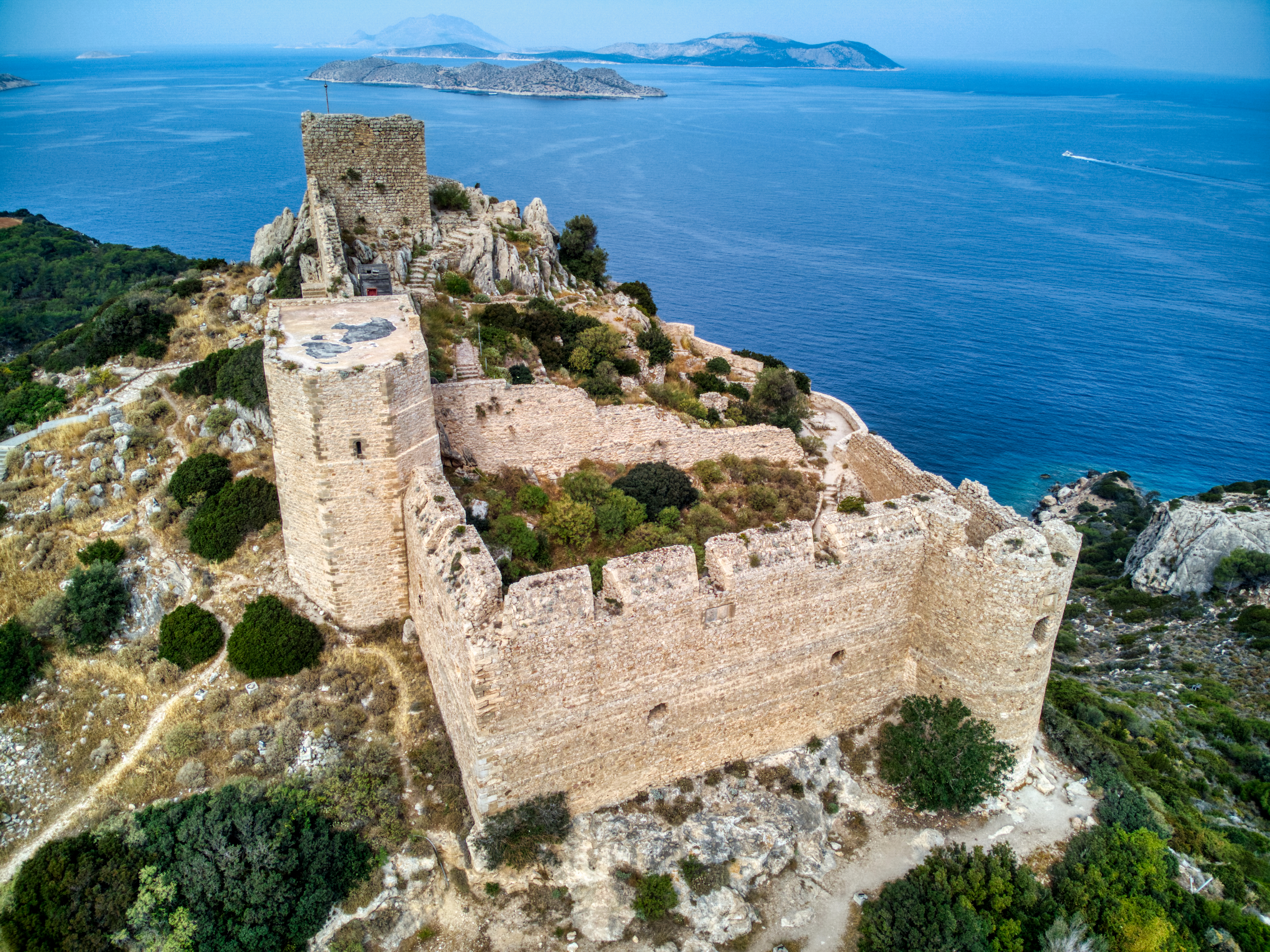
Kastro Kritinias, Kritinia Castle, The Kastellos

The Colossus of Rhodes was considered to be one of the Seven Wonders of the Ancient World. This giant bronze statue was documented as once standing at the harbour. It was completed in 280 BC and destroyed in an earthquake in 226 BC. No trace of the statue remains today.

Historical sites on the island of Rhodes include the Acropolis of Lindos, the Acropolis of Rhodes with the Temple of Pythian Apollo and an ancient theatre and stadium, ancient Ialysos, ancient Kamiros, the Governor's Palace, Rhodes Old Town (walled medieval city), the Palace of the Grand Masters, Kahal Shalom Synagogue in the Jewish Quarter, the Archaeological Museum, the ruins of the castle of Monolithos, the castle of Kritinia, St. Catherine Hospice and Rhodes Footbridge.

== Religion ==
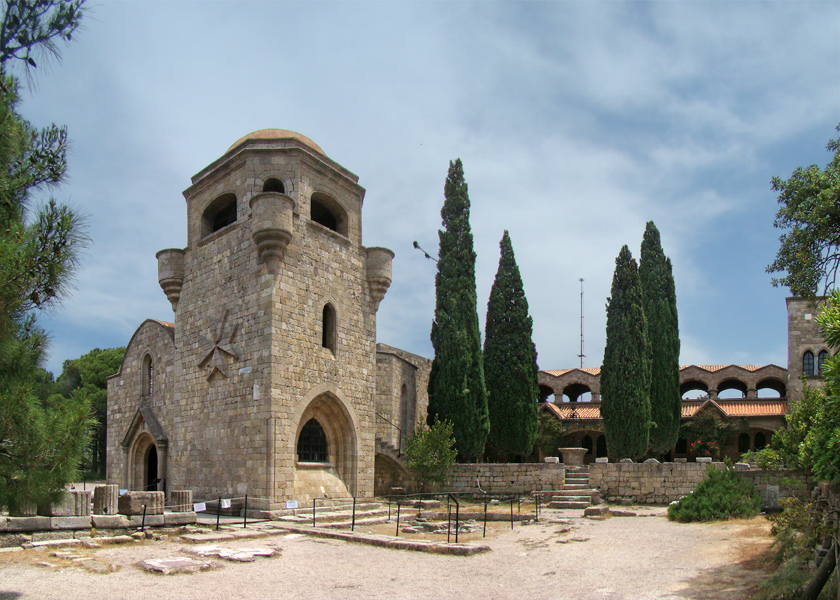
Filerimos Monastery in Ialysos

=== Christianity ===
The predominant religion of Rhodes is Greek Orthodox; the island is the seat of the Metropolis of Rhodes.

There is a Latin Catholic minority on the island of 2,000, many of whom are descendants of Italians who remained after the end of the Italian occupation, pastorally served by the Roman Catholic Archdiocese of Rhodes.

=== Islam ===
Rhodes has a Turkish Muslim minority, which includes Greek Muslims whose ancestors from Crete and the Dodecanese converted to Islam in the Ottoman period. Although a remnant from Ottoman Turkish times they were not required in the population exchange of 1923–24 to resettle in Turkey like the Turkish, Greek, and other Muslim communities living mainly in Macedonia and other parts of Northern Greece because unlike these areas the Dodecanese Islands were under Italian administration at the time. When the islands were ceded to Greece in 1947, a population of about 12,000 Muslims (Greek and Turkish speaking) became Greek citizens. They are organized around the Turkish Association of Rhodes (Turkish: Rodos Türk Derneği), which gives the figure 3,500 for the population they bring together and represent for the island. The number of the Turks in Rhodes could be as many as 4,000.

=== Judaism ===
The Jewish community of Rhodes goes back 2,300 years. Kahal Shalom Synagogue, established in 1557, during the Ottoman era, is the oldest synagogue in Greece and still stands in the Jewish quarter (La Juderia) of the old town of Rhodes. At its peak in the 1920s, the Jewish community was one-third of the town's total population. In the 1940s, there were about 2000 Jews of various ethnic backgrounds. The Nazis deported and killed most of the community during the Holocaust. Kahal Shalom has been renovated with the help of foreign donors but few Jews live year-round in Rhodes today, so services are not held on a regular basis.

The Jewish Museum of Rhodes was established in 1997 to preserve the Jewish history and culture of the Jews of Rhodes. It is adjacent to the Kahal Shalom Synagogue.

The Congolese businessman and politician, and former governor of Katanga, Moïse Katumbi's father, Nissim Soriano was a Greek Sephardic Jew, who fled Rhodes in 1938, who settled in Katanga, in the Congo, a Belgian colony at the time.

== Government ==
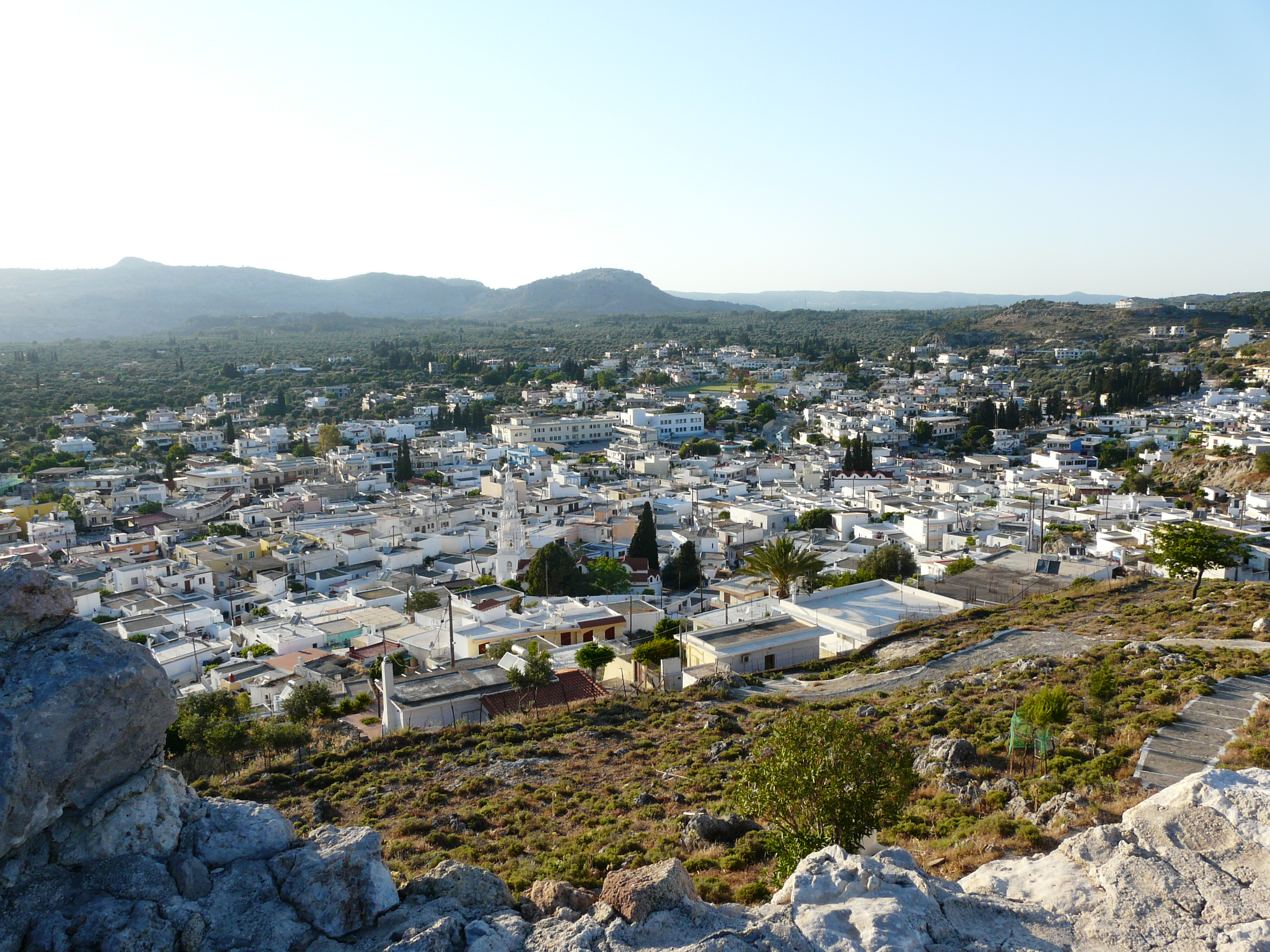
View of Archangelos

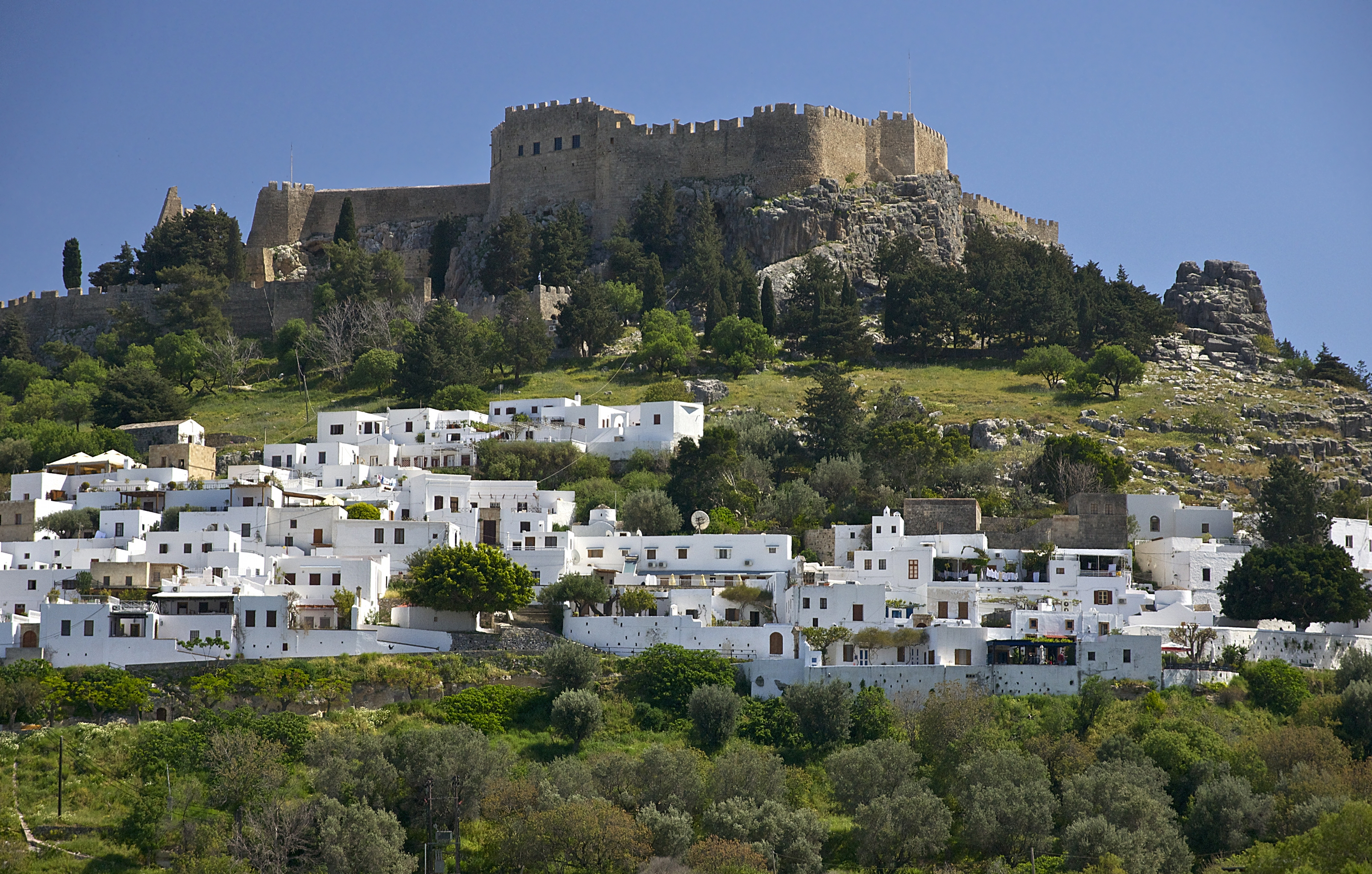
View of Lindos with the Acropolis

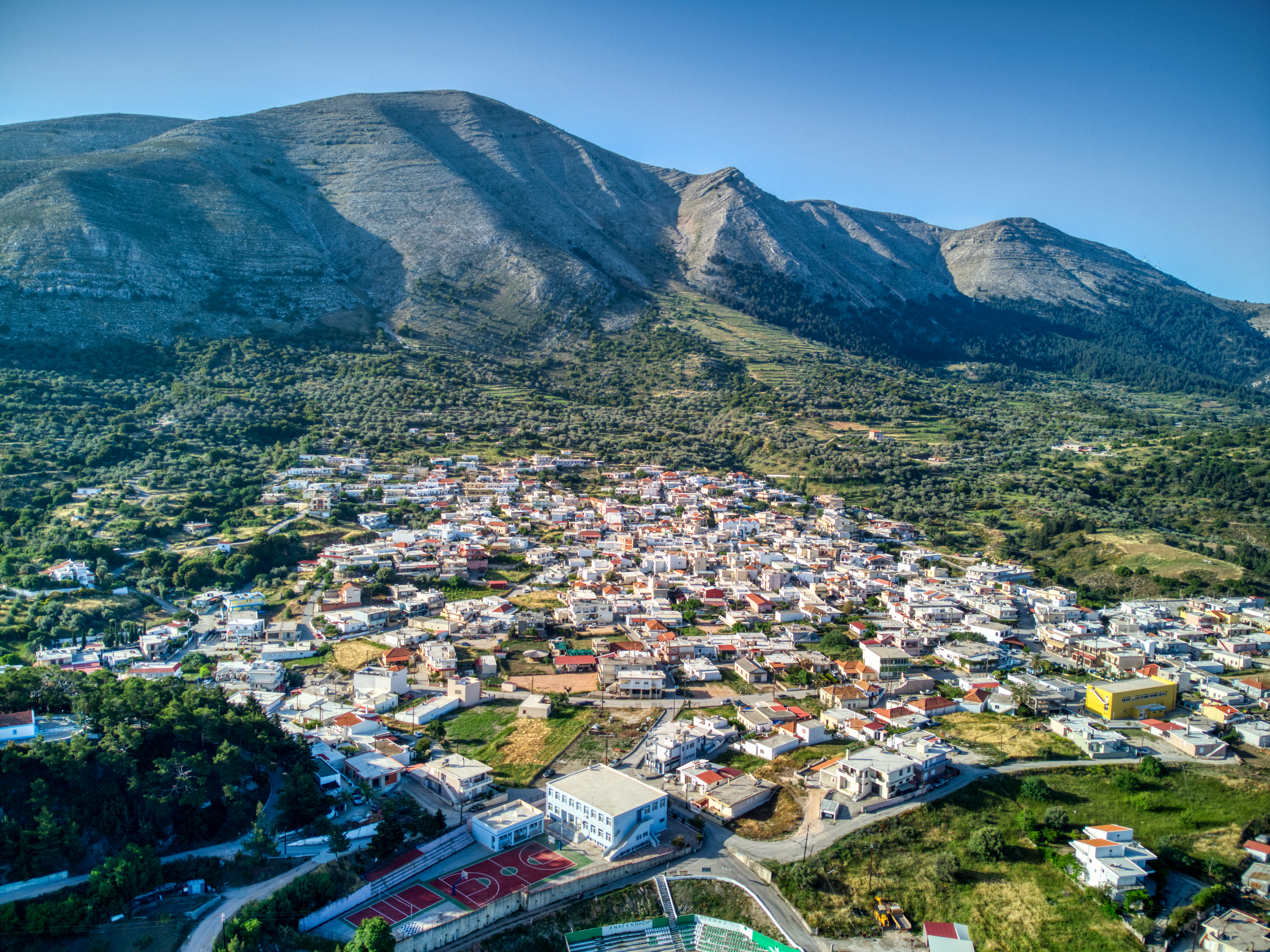
View of Embonas and the mountain of Attavyros

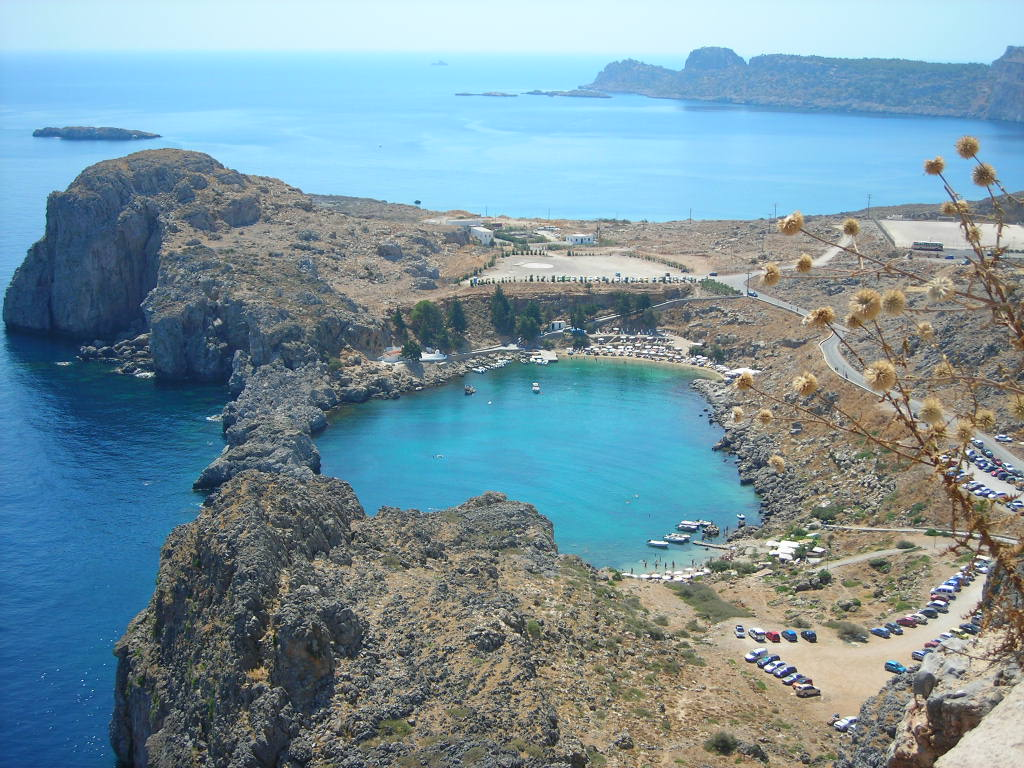
St Paul's Bay, Lindos

The present municipality Rhodes was formed at the 2011 local government reform by the merger of the following 10 former municipalities, that became municipal units (constituent communities in parentheses):

- Afantou (Afantou, Archipoli)
- Archangelos (Archangelos, Malonas, Masari)
- Attavyros (Embonas, Kritinia, Monolithos, Siana, Agios Isidoros)
- Ialysos
- Kallithea (Kalythies, Koskinou, Psinthos)
- Kameiros (Soroni, Apollona, Dimylia, Kalavarda, Platania, Salakos, Fanes)
- Lindos (Lindos, Kalathos, Laerma, Lardos, Pylona)
- Petaloudes (Kremasti, Pastida, Maritsa, Paradeisi, Theologos, Damatria)
- Rhodes
- South Rhodes (Gennadi, Apolakkia, Arnitha, Asklipieio, Vati, Istrios, Kattavia, Lachania, Mesanagros, Profilia)

The municipality has an area of 1400.681 km^{2}. It covers the island of Rhodes and a few uninhabited offshore islets. Rhodes city was the capital of the former Dodecanese Prefecture. Rhodes is the most populated island of the South Aegean Region.

=== Towns and villages ===
Rhodes has 43 towns and villages:

Town/Village	Population	Municipal unit
Rhodes City	50,636	Rhodes
Ialysos	11,331	Ialysos
Afantou	6,329	Afantou
Archangelos	5,476	Archangelos
Kremasti	5,396	Petaloudes
Kalythies	4,832	Kallithea
Koskinou	3,679	Kallithea
Pastida	3,641	Petaloudes
Lindos	3,087	Lindos
Paradeisi	2,667	Petaloudes
Maritsa	1,808	Petaloudes
Lardos	1,380	Lindos
Soroni	1,278	Kameiros
Embonas	1,242	Attavyros
Malona	1,135	Archangelos
Massari	1,004	Archangelos
Fanes	858	Kameiros
Psinthos	853	Kallithea
Apollona	845	Kameiros
Theologos	809	Petaloudes
Asklipio	646	South Rhodes
Archipoli	582	Afantou
Gennadi	671	South Rhodes
Damatria	641	Petaloudes
Pylona	627	Lindos
Salakos	576	Kameiros
Kritinia	503	Attavyros
Kalavarda	502	Kameiros
Kalathos	502	Lindos
Apolakkia	496	South Rhodes
Dimylia	465	Kameiros
Laerma	361	Lindos
Agios Isidoros	355	Attavyros
Vati	323	South Rhodes
Kattavia	307	South Rhodes
Profilia	304	South Rhodes
Istrios	291	South Rhodes
Arnitha	215	South Rhodes
Platania	196	Kameiros
Monolithos	181	Attavyros
Mesanagros	155	South Rhodes
Lachania	153	South Rhodes
Siana	152	Attavyros

== Economy ==
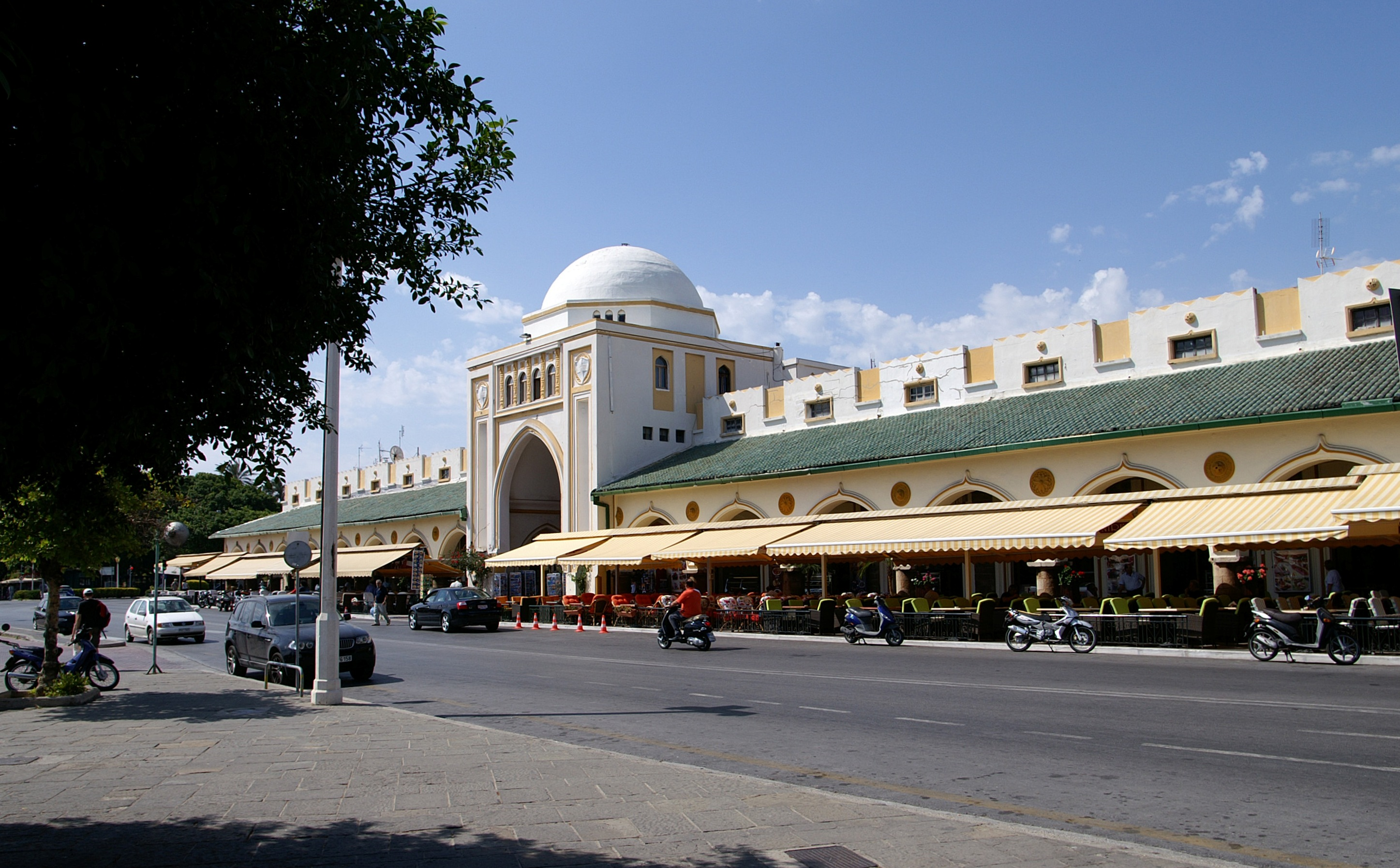
View of the market (Nea Agora) of Mandraki (Rhodes city), built during the Italian period

The economy is tourist-oriented, and the most developed sector is service. Tourism has elevated Rhodes economically, compared to the rest of Greece.

Small industries process imported raw materials for local retail, though other industry includes agricultural goods production, stockbreeding, fishery and winery.

== Transportation ==
=== Air ===
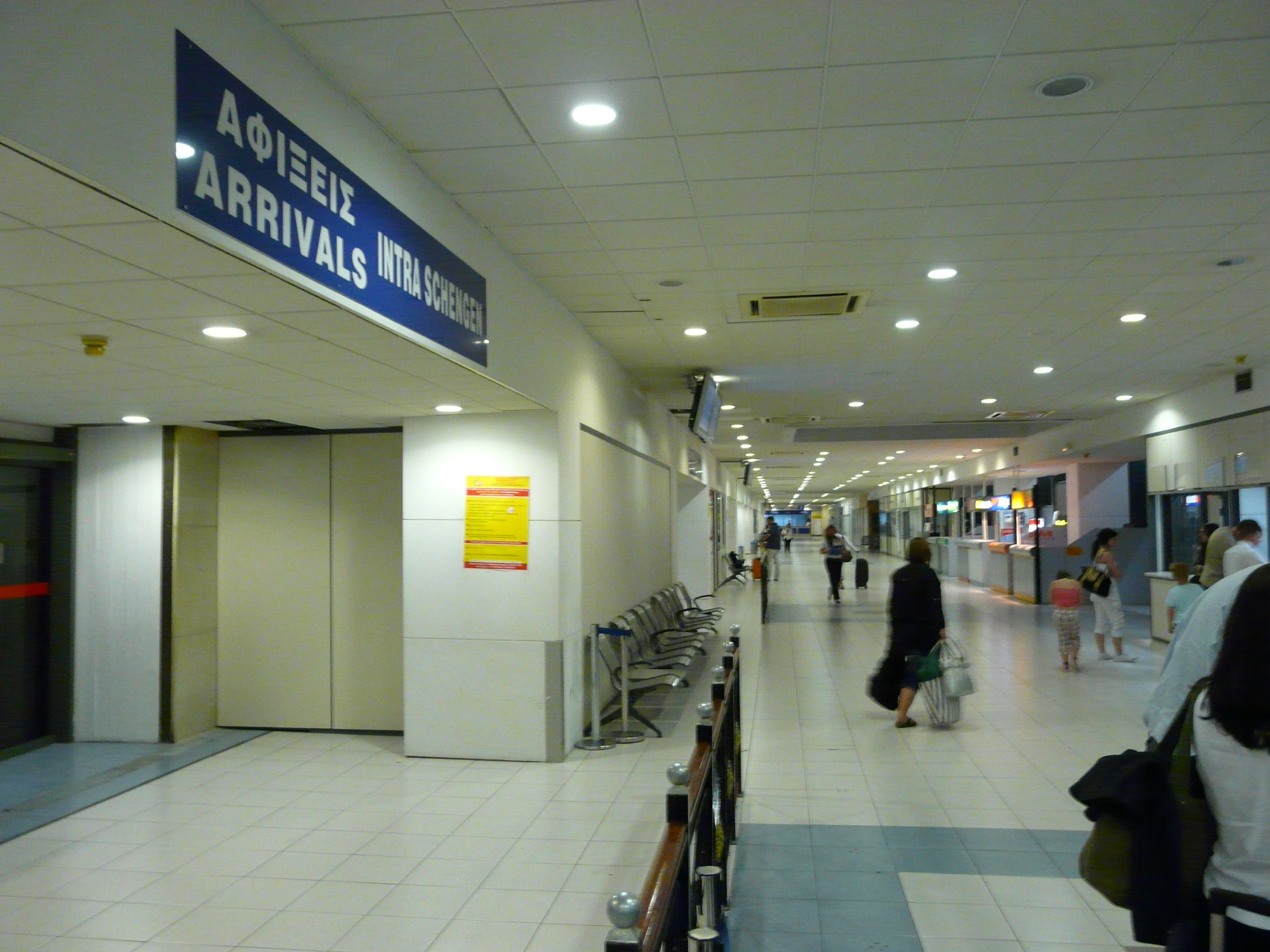
Diagoras Airport, arrivals terminal

Rhodes has two airports, but only one is public. Diagoras Airport, southwest of Rhodes City, is the fourth biggest by passenger volume in Greece, and the main entrance/exit point to the island for both locals and tourists. The island is well connected with other major Greek cities and islands as well as with major European capitals and cities via charter flights. Until 1977, Rhodes Maritsa Airport, built in 1938, was a public airport; it is now used by the Hellenic Air Force and occasionally for car races.

There are also two inoperative airfields. Kalathos Airfield, north of Lindos, and Kattavia Airstrip, to the south of the island, were built by the Italians during the Second World War. Neither remains operational.

Two pilot schools offer aviation services (small plane rental and island hopping).

=== Sea ===
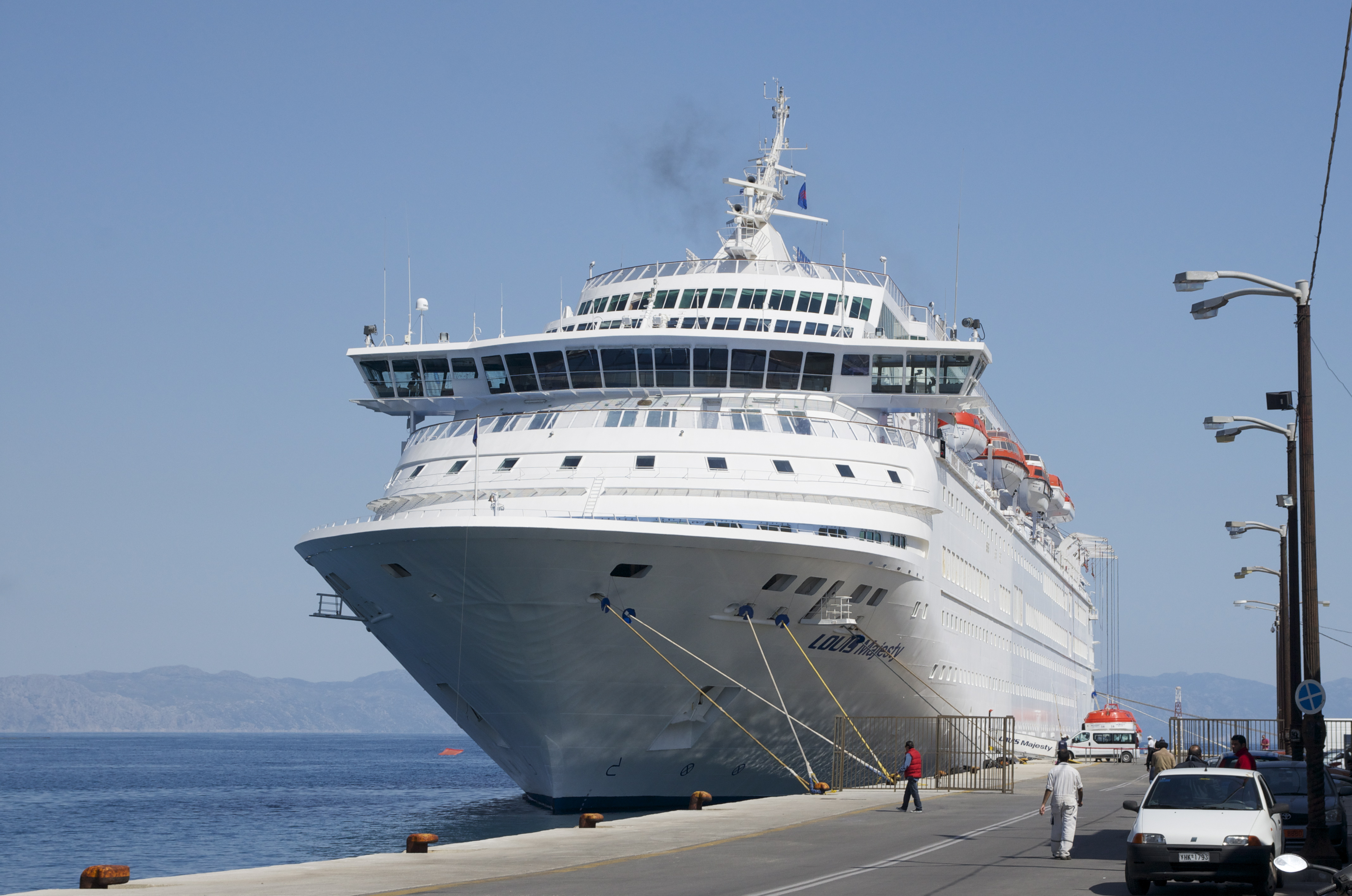
Louis Majesty at the harbour of Rhodes

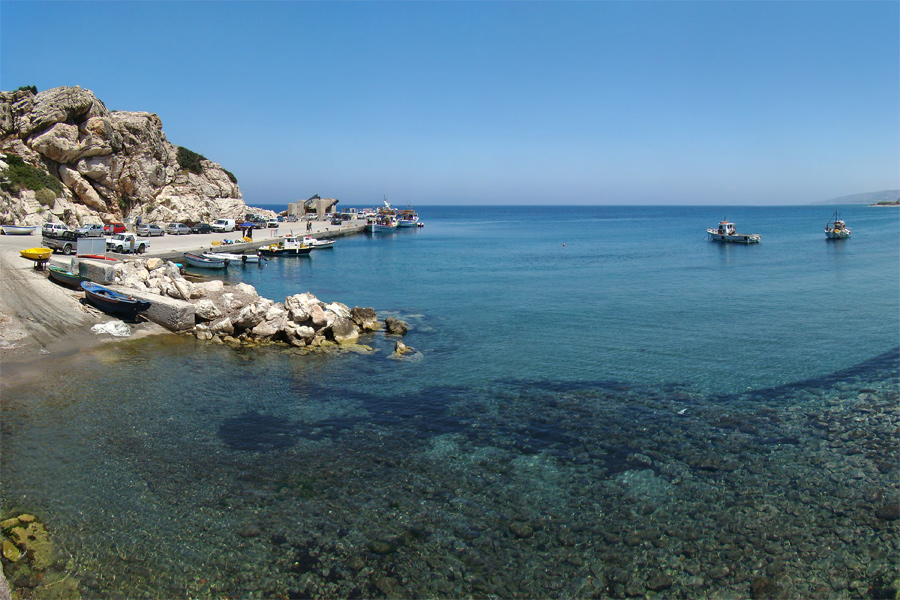
The Kameiros Skala Dock

Rhodes has five ports, three of them in Rhodes City, one in the west coast near Kamiros and one in east coast near Lardos.

- Central Port: located in the city of Rhodes serves exclusively international traffic consisting of scheduled services to/from Turkey, cruise ships and yachts. Since Summer 2012, the port is also a homeport for Costa Cruises during the summer period.
- Kolona Port: opposite and north of the central port, serves intra-Dodecanese traffic and all sizes yachts.
- Akandia Port: the new port of the island, south and next to the central port, being built since the 1960s, for domestic, cargo and general purpose traffic. Since 2017 summer a passenger terminal is finally in use hosting a cafe and waiting lounges.
- Mandraki Port: the oldest port of the island, in the center of Rhodes city. Many cruise boats begin their daily trips to Symi island or to the southern east coast until Lindos.
- Kamiros Skala Dock: 30 km (19 mi) south west of the city near Ancient Kamiros ruins serves mainly the island of Halki.
- Lardos Dock: formerly servicing local industries, now under development as an alternative port for times when the central port is inaccessible due to weather conditions. It is situated in a rocky shore near the village of Lardos in south east Rhodes.

=== From Rhodes to Marmaris and Fethiye ===
- Blue Guide
- Marmaris Lines
- Fethiye Lines
- Marmaris Rodos
- Odek Lines

=== Road network ===
The road network of the island is mostly paved and consists of 3 national roads plus one planned, 40 provincial and numerous local. These are the four major island arteries:

- Rhodes-Kamiros Province Avenue: Province road 2 till Kalavarda village and 21 from there till Kamiros with two lane that runs through the west coast north to south and connects Rhodes City with Diagoras Airport and Kamiros.
- Rhodes-Lindos National Avenue (Greek National Road 95): Four and two lane, runs mainly inland north to south and connects Rhodes City with Lindos. Part from Rhodes Town until Kolympia is now 4 lanes, the rest until Lindos is 2 lanes.
- Rhodes-Kallithea-Faliraki Province Avenue 4: Two lanes, runs through the east coast north to south and connects Rhodes City with Kallithea monument and Faliraki Resort.
- Tsairi-Airport National Avenue (Greek National Road 100): Four and two lane, runs inland east to west and connects the east coast with the west and the airport.
- Lindos-Katavia Province Road 1: Two lane, begins just before Lindos and though villages and resorts leads to Katavia village, the southernmost of the island, from where a further deviation leads to Prasonissi.
- Rhodes Town Ring Road (Phase 1): Beginning from the new marina and ending to Rhodes-Kallithea province avenue is a four lane expressway.

Future roads:

- Further widening of Rhodes-Lindos National Avenue (Greek National Road 95) from Kolympia to Lindos. This is to be four lane with a jersey barrier in the middle. A tender is expected to take place by end of 2019 so as constructions can begin.
- Ring Road phases 2, 3, and 4 pending; phase 2 will extend the expressway to Greek National Road 95 and then to Rhodes General Hospital where it supposedly will connect to also planned new Rhodes City-Airport expressway. In June 2018 Rhodes municipality stated that plans for the final 700 meters of the ring road leading to Akandia Port are pending approval. Phases 3 and 4 which plan to run the ring road from hospital hill down to Ixia and then through Kritika back to the town will most probably never occur.
- Plans also exist for a new four lane express road connecting Rhodes Town with Diagoras Airport. The road, recognised as National back in 2014, will follow existing Provincial Road 3 routing with a total length of 8.6 km and including 3 main junctions and is intended to relieve congestion on the coastal west avenue. The so-called Leoforos Mesogeion is vastly anticipated and is a top priority for local authorities.

=== Bus ===
Bus services are handled by two operators:

- RODA: Municipal bus company that serves Rhodes city as well suburban areas (Koskinou, Faliraki, Ialysos, Kremasti, Airport, Pastida, Maritsa, Paradeisi) and the west coast of the island
- KTEL: Limited liability private transport company that serve villages and resorts in the east coast of the island

=== Cars and motorbikes ===
Families in Rhodes often own more than one car, along with a motorbike. Traffic jams are common particularly in the summer months as vehicles more than double while parking spots downtown and around the old town are limited and can't cope with demand. Moreover, the island is served by 450 taxis and some 200 public and private buses adding to the traffic burden.

== Sports ==
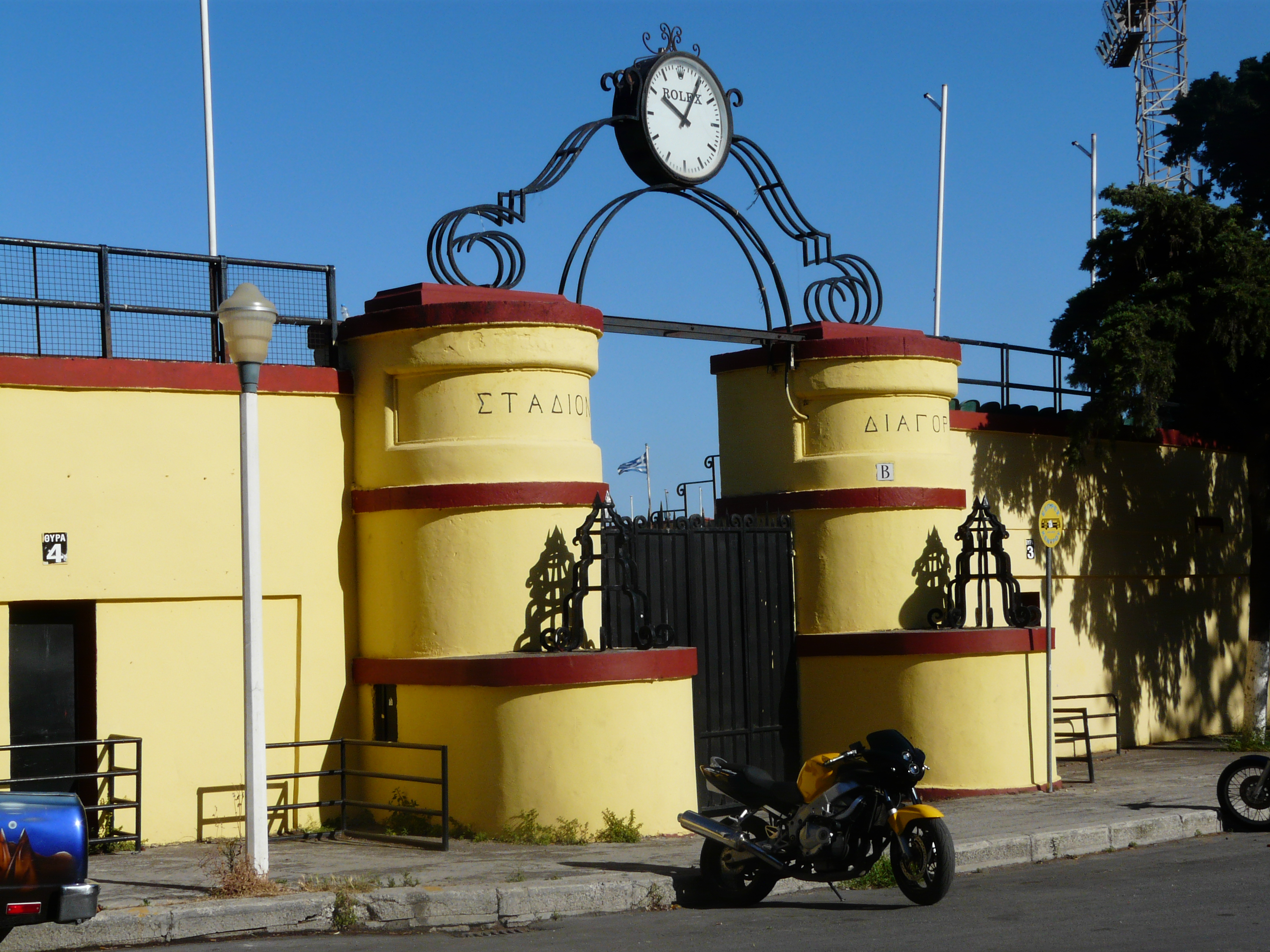
Diagoras Stadium in the city of Rhodes

- Football: AS Rodos and Diagoras F.C. are the island's biggest teams and rivals. The latter competed in the 2018–19 season at the national level third tier (Gamma Ethniki) along with Ialysos and both achieved promotion to (Greek Football League). AS Rodos competed in 1st tier of the local league and ranking 1st achieved promotion and returned after one year to (Gamma Ethniki) which in the 2019–20 season became tier 4. Local football leagues (organized at the prefecture-level) contain three divisions with more than 50 teams. Many stadiums are grass-covered.
- Basketball: Colossus BC sponsors professional basketball and after more than a decade of presence in the top-level Greek Basket League was relegated to Greek A2 Basket League. The local league includes a single division with two groups, one for Rhodes and the other for the other islands, with 7 and 5 teams respectively. Three indoor courts exist in Rhodes City, and one each in Ialysos, Kremasti, and Faliraki. Archangelos town will also get an indoor court according to Rhodes municipality planned works and regional government's approved funds.
- Volleyball: Rodion Athlisis managed to escape local obscurity and until 2018–19 season competed at the national level second-tier failing to achieve promotion to the first level in playoffs for three consecutive seasons. This unlucky streak caused team sponsors to withdraw from the men's team and focus solely on developing youth academies.
- Water polo: mostly amateur-based. There is not any single public indoor pool on the island.
- Rugby: introduced in 2007. Teams compete at the national level.
- Tennis: Rhodes Tennis Club (Ροδιακός Όμιλος Αντισφαίρισης) promotes officially tennis since 1949. Club operates on two separate locations, one downtown next to the casino and one next to Kallipateira National Athletic Centre.
- Water sports: Due to strong seasonal winds in this part of the Aegean Sea, Rhodes is a popular sailing destination, hosting regattas such as the Aegean Regatta. In addition, windsurfing, kiteboarding and wing foiling have become popular along the northern part of the west coast and at the island's southernmost tip Prasonisi.
- Cycling: For a long period of time Rhodes had the only velodrome in Greece. For the moment, the island is the seat of the Dodecanissos Local Cycling Committee. Most notable cycling clubs are Rodilios CC, Diagoras GC, Elafos CC, Iviskos CC, all based in the city of Rhodes, plus Antaios SC of Kremasti and Athlos SC of Paradeisi. In Rhodes, the International Tour of Rhodes, part of UCI Europe Tour Cycling Calendar, is annually organized.
- Rhodes competed in the bi-annual Island Games, which it hosted in 2007. Since 2019 is suspended from competition.

== Cuisine ==
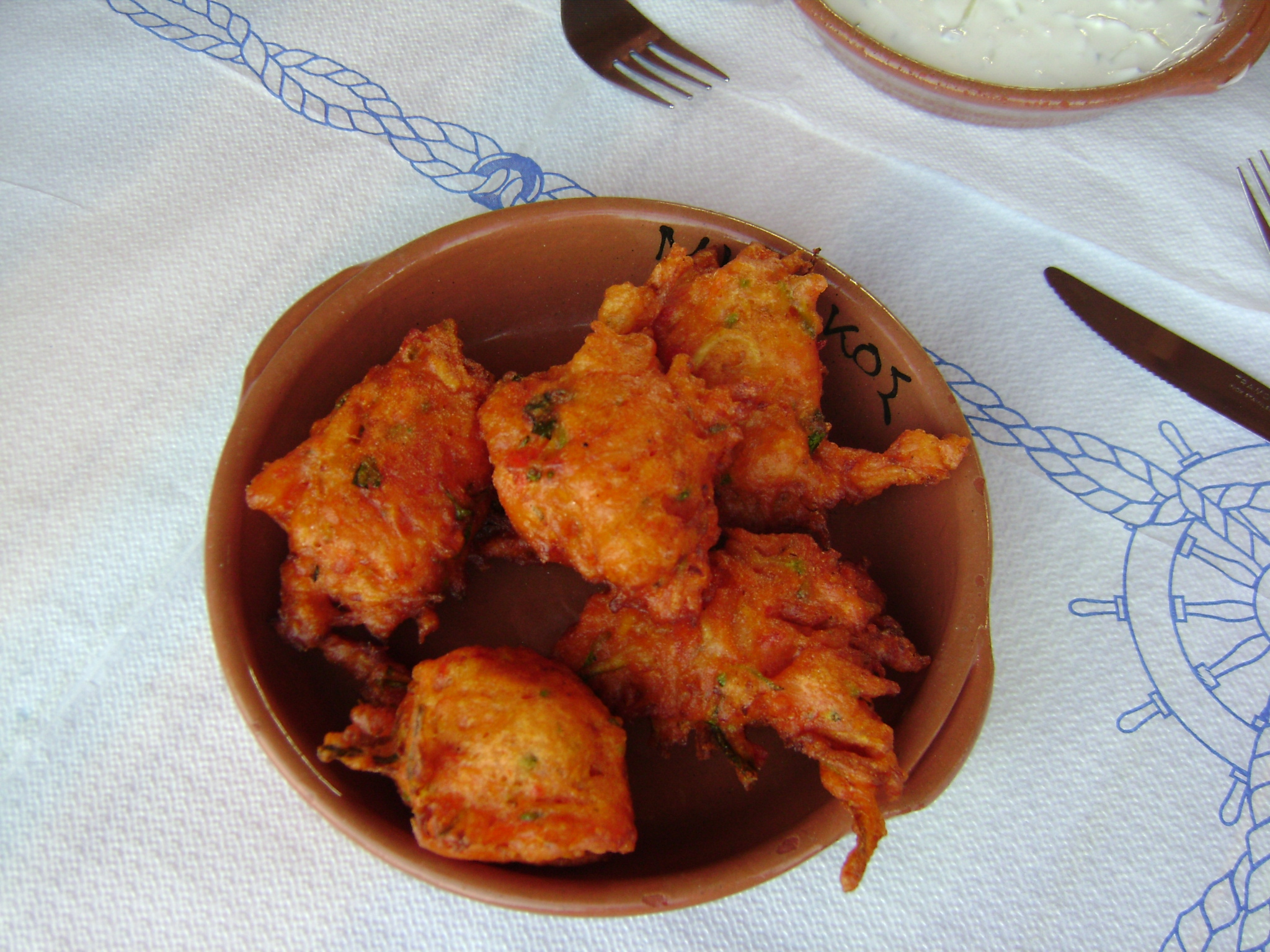
Pitaroudia, a traditional chickpea dumpling from Rhodes and Dodecanese

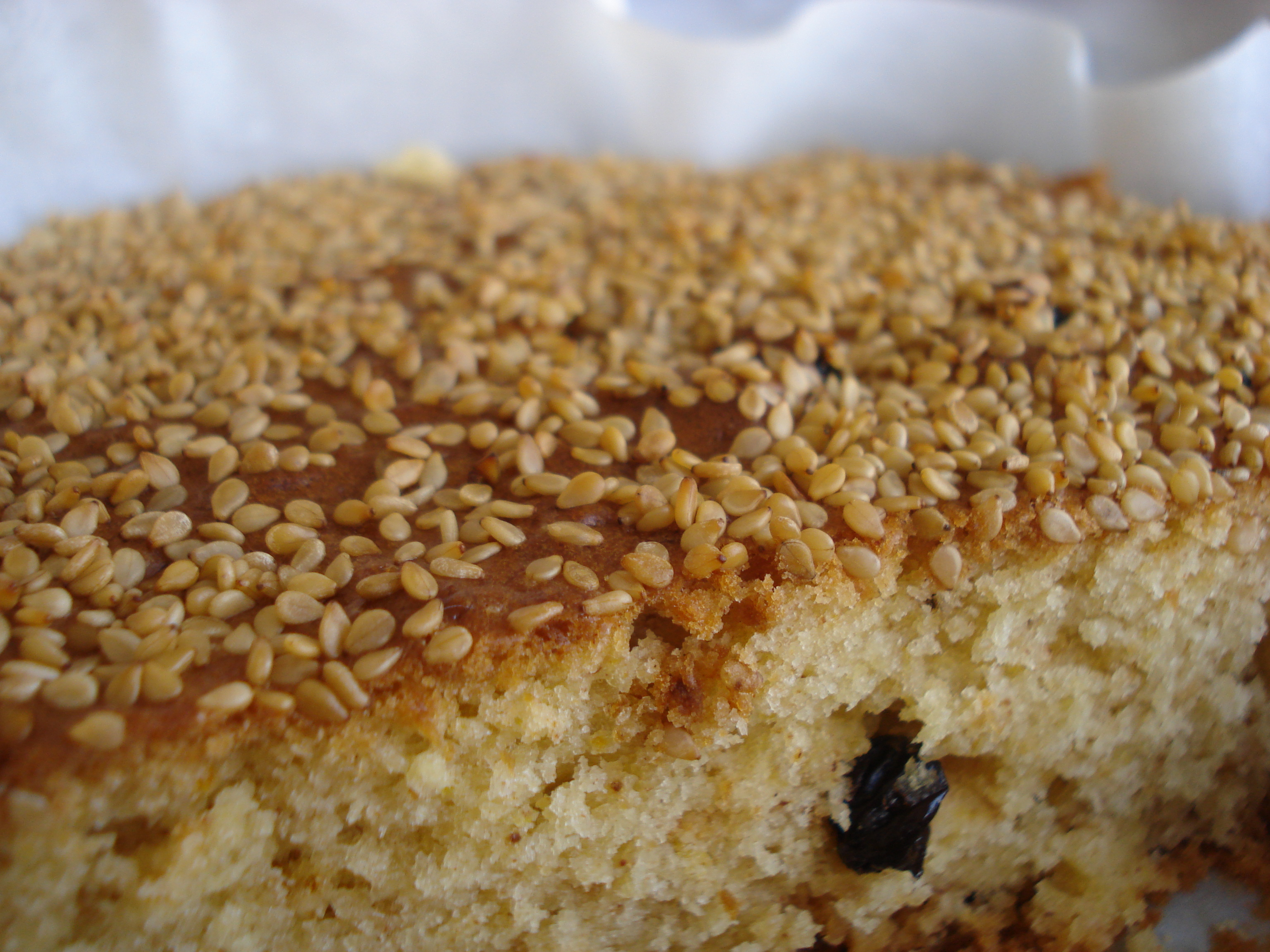
Fanouropita

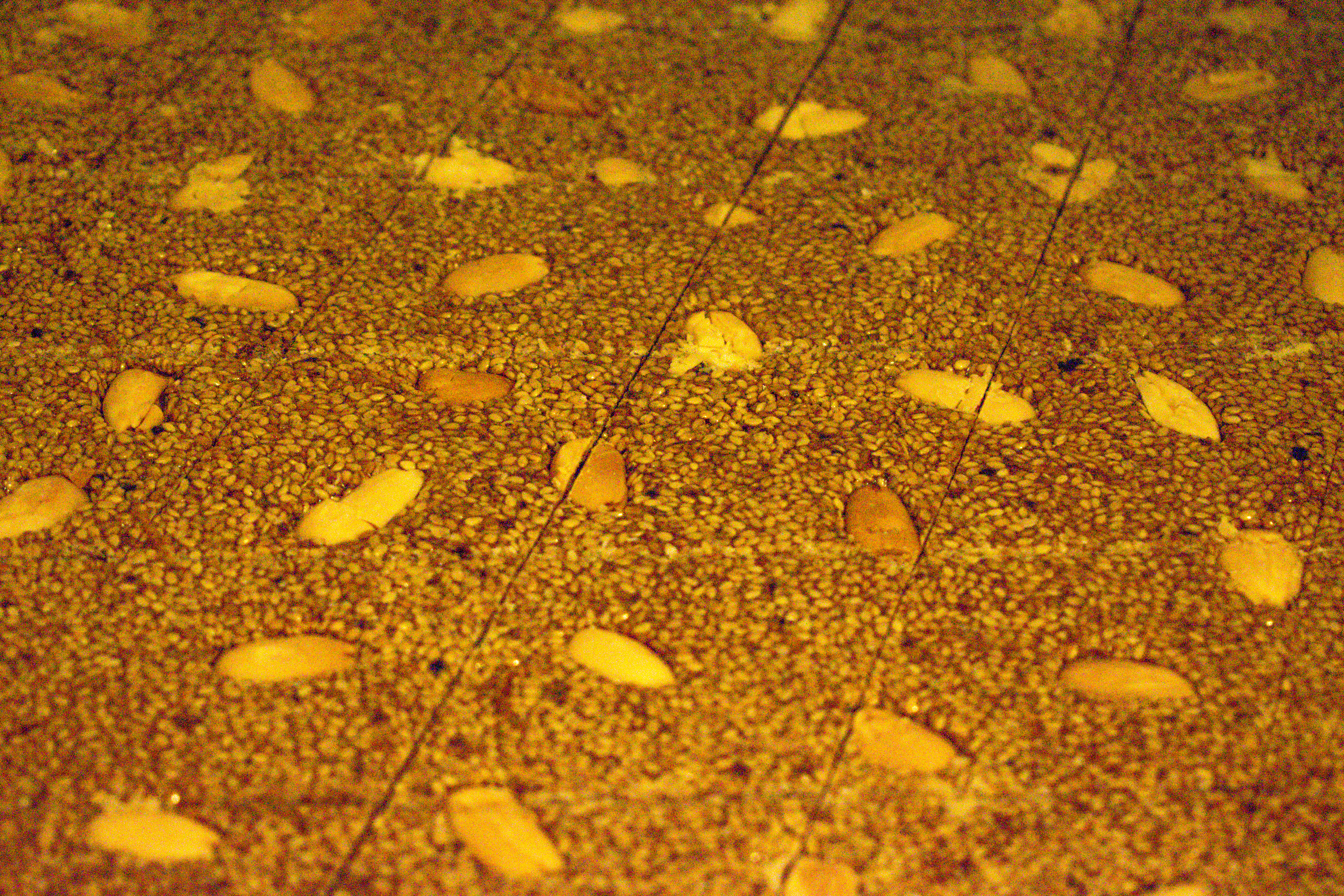
Melekouni

Rhodian tradition in cuisine is rich. Koriantolino and Souma (colorless alcoholic beverage produced from grape distillation) are the main alcoholic drinks of Rhodes. Local foods include:

- Escharitis, type of bread
- Pitaroudia
- Milla and Tsiriggia, meat fat
- Pougia pie
- Lakani, goat meat with chickpeas
- Lópia (beans) with goat
- Matsi, hand made pasta used to make Koulouría, a traditional recipe
- Synoro, traditional cheese
- Tahinopita
- Zvigoi, type of loukoumades
- Melekouni
- Fanouropita
- Takakia (Mantinades)
- Katimeria (tiganites, pancakes)
- Amygdalota, white almond cookies
- Moschopougia

== Notable people ==
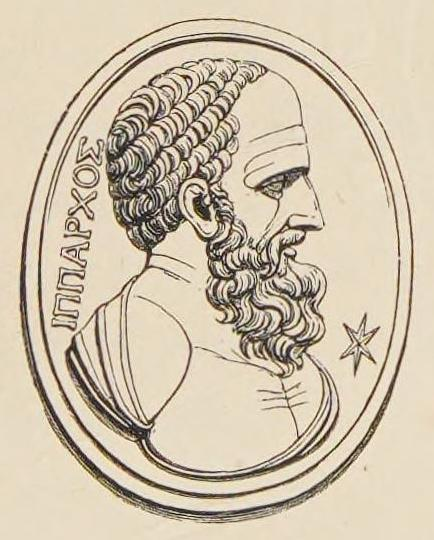
Head of Hipparchus

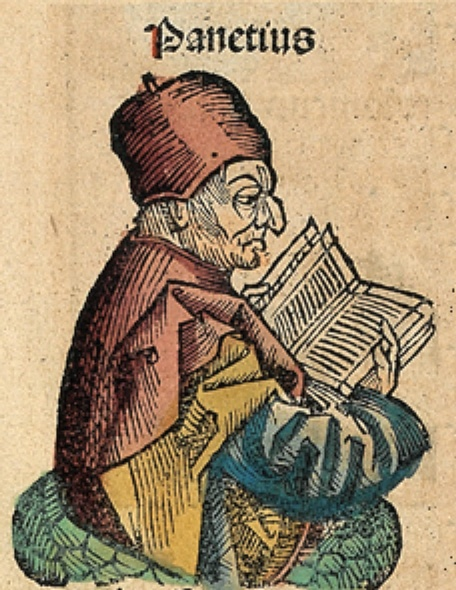
Panaetius, from Nuremberg Chronicle

- Agesander of Rhodes (1st century BC), sculptor.
- Apollonius Molon (fl. 70s BC), Greek rhetorician had a celebrated school on the island; his students included Marcus Tullius Cicero.
- Apollonius of Rhodes (3rd century BC), epic poet.
- Chares of Lindos (3rd century BC), sculptor.
- Cleobulus of Lindos (6th century BC), philosopher and one of the Seven Sages of Ancient Greece.
- Dinocrates (4th century BC), architect and technical adviser for Alexander the Great.
- Hecato of Rhodes (c. 100 BC), Stoic philosopher.
- Hieronymus of Rhodes, (c.290-c.230 BC), Peripatetic philosopher
- Hipparchus, (2nd century BC), astronomer, mathematician, geographer, founder of trigonometry.
- Joannicius II of Constantinople, (died 1659) Ecumenical Patriarch of Constantinople
- Memnon of Rhodes (380–333 BC), commander of mercenary army.
- Mentor of Rhodes (385–340 BC), mercenary soldier, brother of Memnon.
- Panaetius (c. 185 – c. 110/109 BC), Stoic philosopher.
- Timocreon (5th century BC), poet.

and

- Lawrence Durrell (1912–1990), writer and poet, author of The Alexandria Quartet, resided on Rhodes 1945–1947. In 1953 his travel book about Rhodes – Reflections on a Marine Venus – was published.
- Reşit Galip (1893–1934), Turkish politician, one of the first ministers of education of the Republic of Turkey
- Ferruccio Lamborghini (1916–1993), Italian automobile designer, was stationed on the island as an air-force mechanic in WW2
- George Marshall (1781–1855) author and Master Gunner, United States Navy
- Murat Reiz Plaku (1534–1609), Albanian Navy Commander and Ottoman privateer
- Panagiotis Rodios (1789–1851), revolutionary and Hellenic Army officer
- Ioannis Zigdis (1913–1997), politician and economist

=== Sport ===
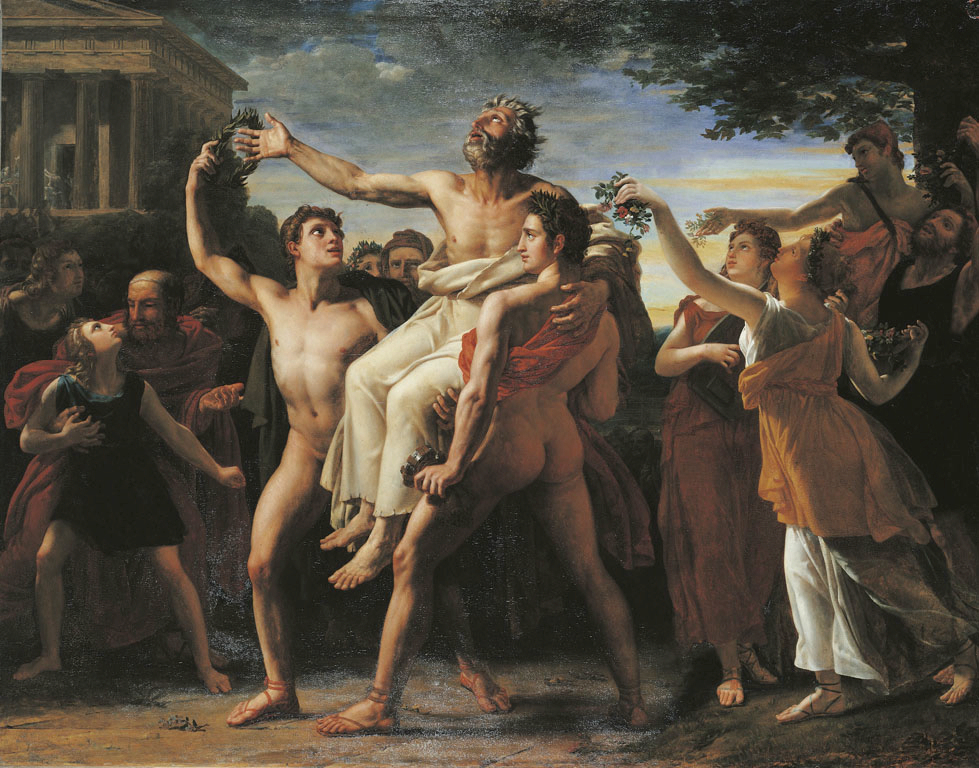
Diagoras of Rhodes carried in the stadium by his two sons

- Diagoras of Rhodes (5th century BC), boxer, multiple Olympic winner.
- Leonidas of Rhodes (2nd century BC), Olympic champion runner
- Braith Anasta (born 1982), rugby league player and NRL premiership winner, ancestral ties to the island through his father
- Stergos Felegakis (born 1986), professional football player
- Nick Galis (born 1957), basketball player, FIBA Hall of Fame and Naismith Memorial Basketball Hall of Fame member (his father was born in a small village called Agios Isidoros)
- Niki Xanthou (born 1973), long jumper

== Tourism ==
Rhodes is one of the most popular tourist destinations in Greece. After Crete, the island is the most visited destination in Greece, with arrivals standing at 1,785,305 in 2013. In 2014 they stood at 1,931,005, while in 2015 the arrival number reduced slightly and stood at 1,901,000. The average length of stay is estimated at 8 days. Guests from Great Britain, Israel, France, Italy, Sweden and Norway constitute the biggest portion in terms of the arrivals by country. In Rhodes, the supply of available rooms is high, since more than 550 hotels are operating in the island, the majority of which are two star hotels.

== In popular culture ==
- "Hic Rhodus, hic salta!", a phrase from antiquity
- The Hellenic Traders series of historical novels by Harry Turtledove centers around the adventures of a trading galley based in Rhodes during the 4th century BCE.
- Movies shot on the island include The Guns of Navarone (1961), Kiss the Girls by Giannis Dalianidis (1965), and Escape to Athena (1979). Rhodes was also the setting of Agatha Christie's "Triangle at Rhodes".

== Panoramas ==
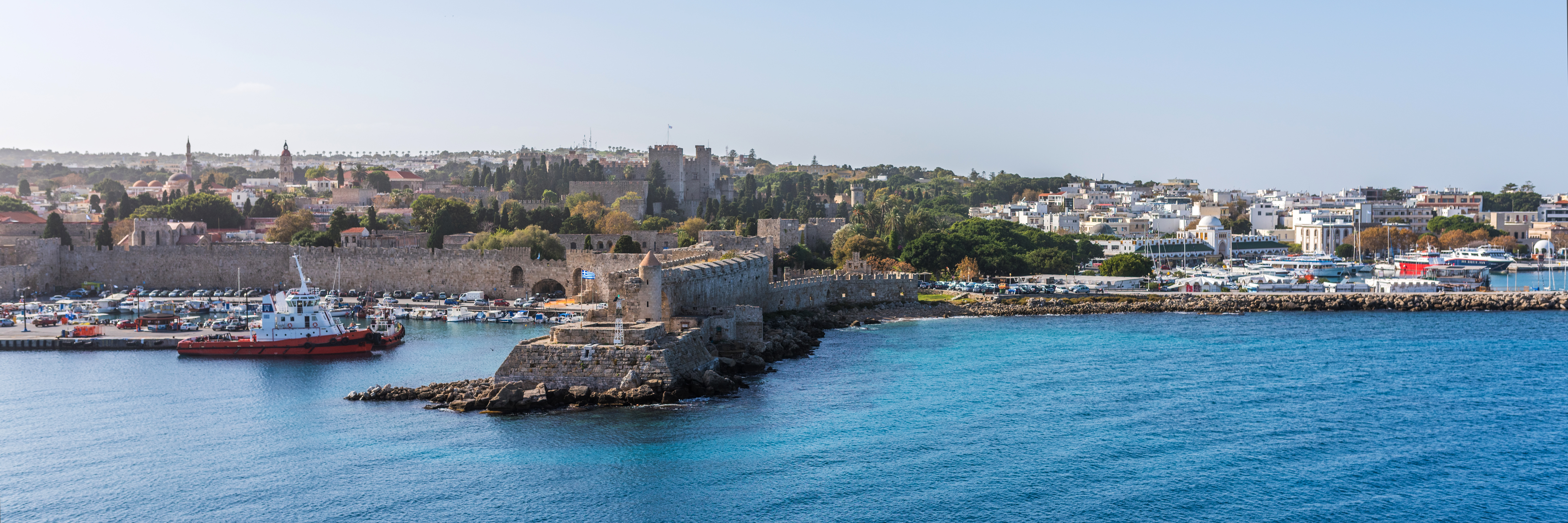
Rhodes harbor in 2017

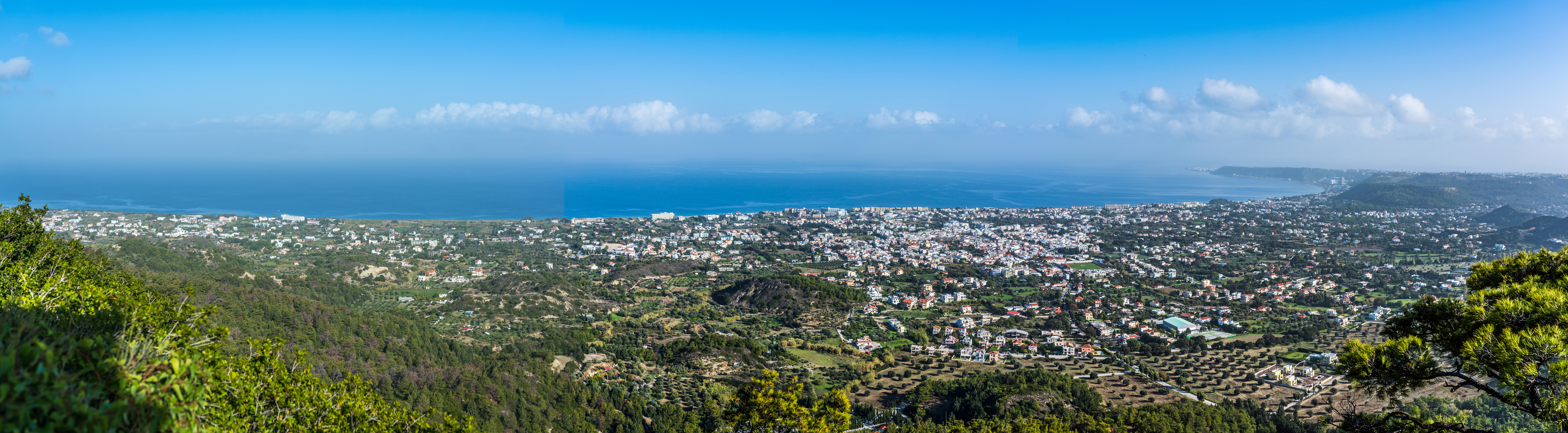
Rhodes panorama in 2017

== See also ==
- 95th National Guard Higher Command (Greece)
- Ancient regions of Anatolia
- Brygindara
- Medieval Rose

== Sources ==
- Greatrex, Geoffrey; Lieu, Samuel N. C. (2005). The Roman Eastern Frontier and the Persian Wars AD 363–628. Routledge. ISBN 978-1134756469.
- Howard-Johnston, J.D. (2006). East Rome, Sasanian Persia and the End of Antiquity: Historiographical and Historical Studies. Ashgate Publishing, Ltd. ISBN 978-0860789925.
- Kia, Mehrdad (2016). The Persian Empire: A Historical Encyclopedia. ABC-CLIO. ISBN 978-1610693912. Two volumes.
