= Pefko =

Pefko may refer to:

- Pefko, Messenia, a small village in Messenia, Greece
- Nea Peramos, a suburb of Athens, Greece, formerly known as Megalo Pefko
- Pefkos, a beach resort near Rhodos, Greece
- Pefkos, Crete, a village in Viannos municipality, Crete
