= Sérginho Ribeiro =

Portuguese footballer

Serginho
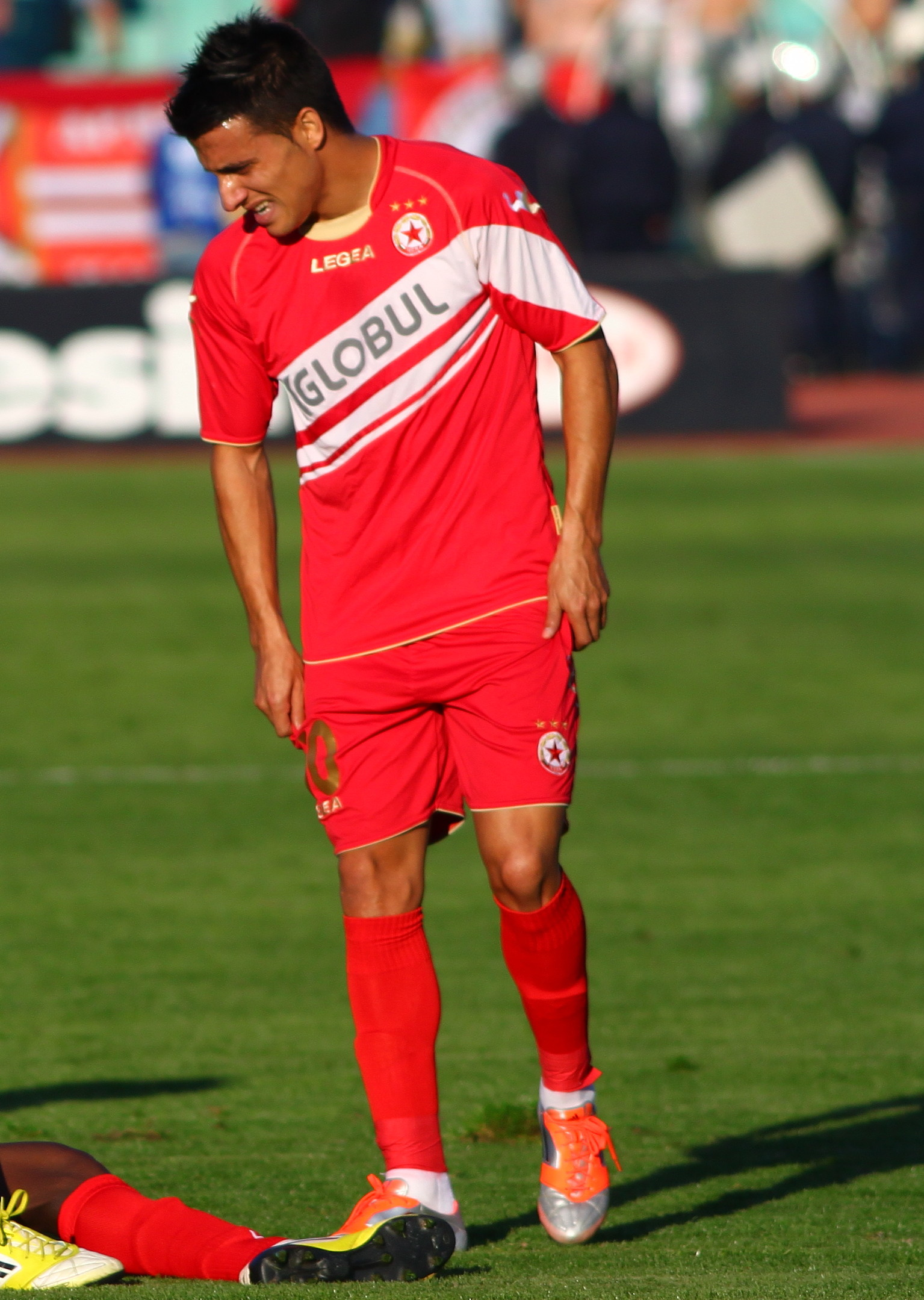
- Serginho in action for CSKA Sofia

Personal information
- Full name: Sérgio Filipe Dias Ribeiro
- Date of birth: 16 June 1985 (age 41)
- Place of birth: Porto, Portugal
- Height: 1.78 m (5 ft 10 in)
- Position: Attacking midfielder

Team information
- Current team: Iraklis Lardos
- Number: 7

Youth career
- 2000–2003: Pedras Rubras

Senior career*
Years	Team	Apps	(Gls)
2003–2005	Pedras Rubras	51	(10)
2005–2007	Vihren	40	(2)
2007–2009	Pierikos	56	(4)
2009–2010	Levadiakos	32	(1)
2011–2012	Lokomotiv Plovdiv	41	(5)
2012–2013	CSKA Sofia	19	(5)
2013–2014	Metalurh Zaporizhzhia	27	(0)
2015	AEL	19	(0)
2015	Lamia	8	(1)
2016–2017	Trikala	20	(1)
2017	Ergotelis	13	(1)
2017–2018	Rodos	8	(1)
2018	Diagoras	11	(3)
2018–2019	Olympiacos Volos	25	(13)
2019	Ialysos	8	(2)
2020	Diagoras	3	(0)
2021-22	AO Megisti	12	(17)
2022-23	Iraklis Lardos	18	(4)
- * Club domestic league appearances and goals as of 18 August 2020

Sérgio Filipe Dias Ribeiro (born 16 June 1985), commonly known as Serginho, is a Portuguese professional footballer who plays as an attacking midfielder for Iraklis Lardou

== Club career ==
Born in Porto, Serginho started his career with F.C. Pedras Rubras, playing his first two seasons as a senior in the third division. He moved abroad in 2005, signing with Bulgarian club FC Vihren Sandanski.

On 7 August 2005, Serginho made his A Football Group debut, in a 3–1 home win against PFC Beroe Stara Zagora. Towards the end of the campaign he scored his first league goal, helping to a 2–0 home success over PFC Naftex Burgas on 20 May.

Serginho spent the following three and a half seasons in Greece, his only top level experience being in 2009–10 with Levadiakos F (22 matches, one goal, team relegation). In January 2011 he returned to Bulgaria, going on to represent PFC Lokomotiv Plovdiv and PFC CSKA Sofia.

In the following years, in quick succession, Serginho played for FC Metalurh Zaporizhya (Ukrainian Premier League), AEL, PAS Lamia 1964 and Trikala, all in the Greek second tier.

After that season Serginho went to the Island of Rhodes on 10 July 2016 to play for Rodos and then the latter season on 1 January he joined Diagoras.

He dropped to the third division of the latter country on 13 January 2017, signing with Ergotelis FC.

On 31 July 2018 Serginho joined Olympiacos Volos in the third division of Greece, Scoring 13 goals in 25 appearances.

After a successful season at Volos Serginho went to the Island of Rhodes again this time to play for Ialysos in the Football League, he then rejoined Diagoras but only made 3 appearances all season

He had a Career Break after years of Football but came back in 2021 from his well-deserved break joining the newly formed football club called AO Megisti in Kastellorizo, a Greek Island. He scored 17 goals in 12 appearances making him 2nd in the goalscorers sheet

In 2022 he joined Iraklis Lardos, where he played 18 matches in the Dodecanese FCA 1st Division only scoring 4 goals with no assists or any cards.

He currently is the General Manager of Iraklis Lardos after a good season at the club and has signed another 1-year deal with the club.

== Club statistics ==
As of 7 July 2023

Club	Season	League		Cup		Europe		Total	
Club	Season	Apps	Goals	Apps	Goals	Apps	Goals	Apps	Goals
Pedras Rubras	2003–04	14	0	0	0	–	–	14	0
Pedras Rubras	2004–05	37	9	0	0	–	–	37	9
Vihren	2005–06	25	1	3	0	–	–	28	1
Vihren	2006–07	15	1	2	1	–	–	17	2
Pierikos	2007–08	28	1	0	0	–	–	28	1
Pierikos	2008–09	28	3	0	0	–	–	28	3
Levadiakos	2009–10	22	1	0	0	–	–	22	1
Levadiakos	2010–11	10	0	0	0	–	–	10	0
Lokomotiv Plovdiv	2010–11	14	1	1	0	–	–	15	1
Lokomotiv Plovdiv	2011–12	26	4	4	0	1	0	31	4
CSKA Sofia	2012–13	19	5	3	0	–	–	22	5
Metalurg	2013–14	27	0	2	0	–	–	29	0
AEL	2014–15	19	0	0	0	–	–	19	0
PAS Lamia	2015–16	8	1	1	0	–	–	9	1
AO Trikala	2015–16	14	1	2	0	–	–	16	1
AO Trikala	2016–17	6	0	2	0	–	–	8	0
Ergotelis	2016–17	11	1	2	0	–	–	13	1
Rodos	2017–18	8	1	0	0	–	–	8	1
Diagoras	2018	11	3	0	0	–	–	11	3
Olympiacos Volos	2018–19	25	13	0	0	–	–	25	13
Ialysos	2019–20	8	2	3	1	–	–	11	3
Diagoras	2020	3	0	0	0	–	–	3	0
AO Megisti	2021–22	12	17	0	0	–	–	12	17
Iraklis Lardos	2022–23	17	4	1	0	–	–	18	4
Iraklis Lardos	2023–24	—	—	—	—	–	–	—	—
Career totals		407	68	26	2	1	0	433	70
