= Pefkos =

Beach resort on the eastern coast of Rhodes, Greece

Coordinates: 36.075631°N 28.050404°E

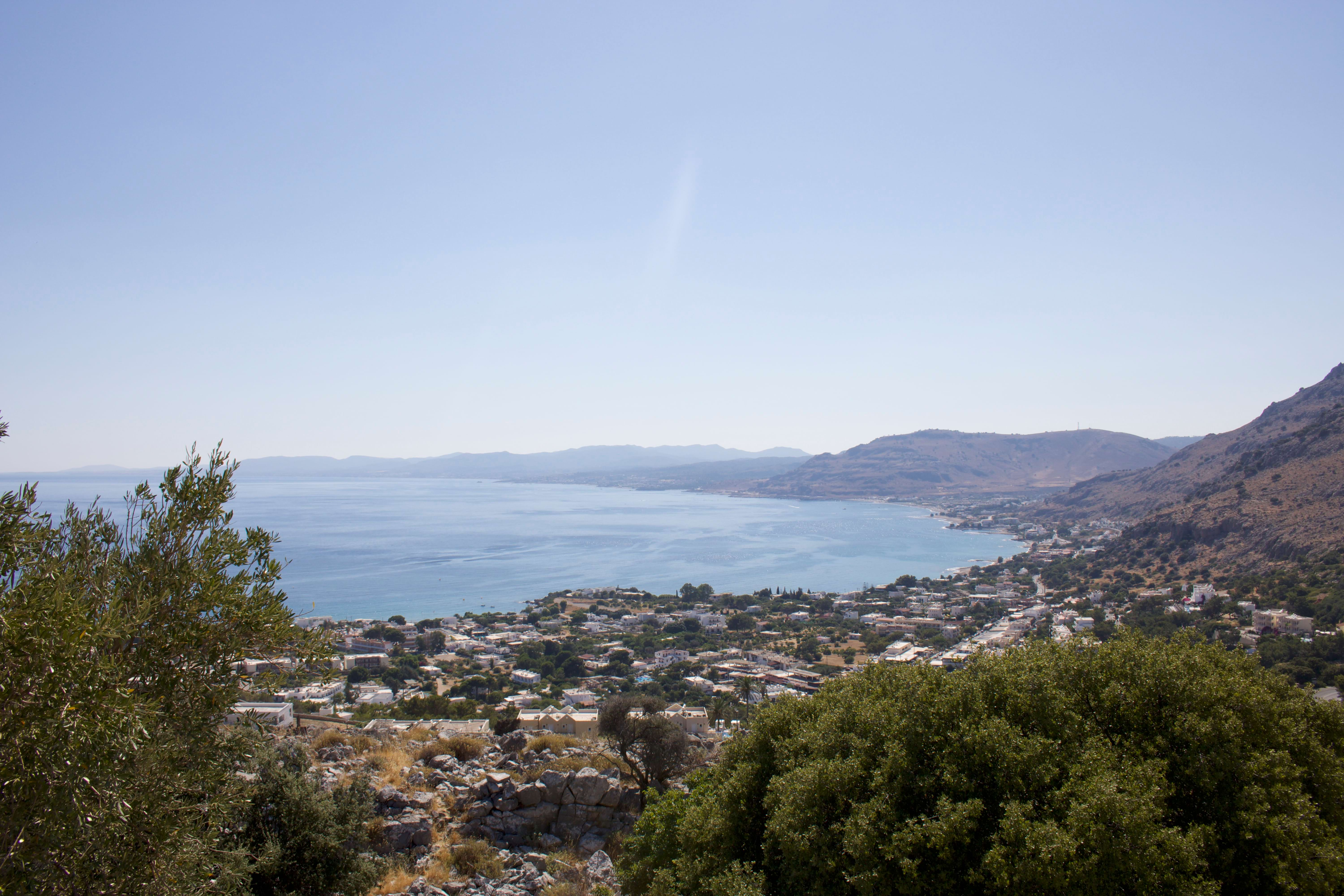
View of Pefkos

Overlooking Pefkos

Location of Pefkos on the island of Rhodes, Greece

Pefkos or Pefki, Greek: Πεύκος (Πεύκοι), is a well-known beach resort located on eastern coast of Rhodes, just 4 kilometres (2.5 mi) southwest of Lindos, and 43 kilometres (27 mi) from the capital city Rhodes. The island of Rhodes is the largest of the Dodecanese islands, on the eastern Aegean Sea, just a few miles from the coast of the Asia Minor. Pefkos was once known as a fishermen's hamlet located along the coastal road that connects the villages of Lindos and Lardos. Originally Pefkos was mainly used as a summer temporary residence for those who lived further inland but grew crops such as grapes, olives, tomatoes, figs and corn. They couldn't return home daily due to the heat and distance, so had small very basic houses in Pefkos. Visiting Pefkos by day will leave one with the impression of a quiet and relaxed holiday resort; however when the lights come on the resort is bustling with warm, friendly activity.

The main Pefkos beach (Lee beach) is a pure sand beach and is a Blue Flag status awarded beach for 2008. The beach is busy with tourists during the day, currently there are 3 restaurants on the waterfront. The beach is quiet, with no motorised watersports.

Pefkos, until recently was underdeveloped, but is now swiftly evolving in an important tourist resort, mostly offering self-catering holiday accommodation (villas and apartments) while its commercial centre has many amenities and a large range of restaurants, tavernas and bars. The resort is set against a hill which is surrounded by Pine trees from which the town gets its name. It is largely visited by Scandinavians, Brits, Germans, Poles and Austrians.
