= Brygindara =

Ancient city in Rhodes, Greece

Brygindara was a city in Rhodes island perhaps near to Lindos. Brygindis was the local eponym goddess or heroine and Brygindarios the citizen.
