= Lardos =

Lardos Λάρδος
- Community
- Location within Greece
- Coordinates: 36°05.60′N 28°01′E
- Country: Greece
- Administrative region: South Aegean
- Regional unit: Rhodes
- Municipality: Rhodes
- Municipal unit: Lindos

Population (2021)
  - Community: 1,888
- Time zone: UTC+2 (EET)
  - Summer (DST): UTC+3 (EEST)

Lardos (Λάρδος) is a village on the Lardos stream, also called Fonias, located in the eastern part of the island of Rhodes, in the South Aegean region of Greece. As of the 2021 census, it had a permanent population of 1,888.

The village lies about 54 km south of the city of Rhodes and about 8 km west of Lindos.

== Population ==
The population trend over recent censuses is shown below:

Year	Permanent population
1991	1,461
2001	1,655
2011	1,706
2021	1,888

== History ==
The settlement has been historically connected with agriculture, particularly olive groves and vineyards. During the 20th century, some residents also worked in nearby Lindos due to the growth of tourism.

== Transport ==
Lardos is connected to Rhodes town and Lindos by public bus services operated by KTEL Rodou.

== Economy and tourism ==
The economy of Lardos is still based on agriculture, but tourism has developed steadily. The village centre has tavernas and cafés, while nearby beaches host hotels and apartments catering to visitors.

== See also ==
- Lartos, Rhodes
- Lindos
- Gennadi
