= Chapel of St. George Pachymachiotis =

Chapel in Lindos, Greece

Coordinates: 36.0929°N 28.0869°E

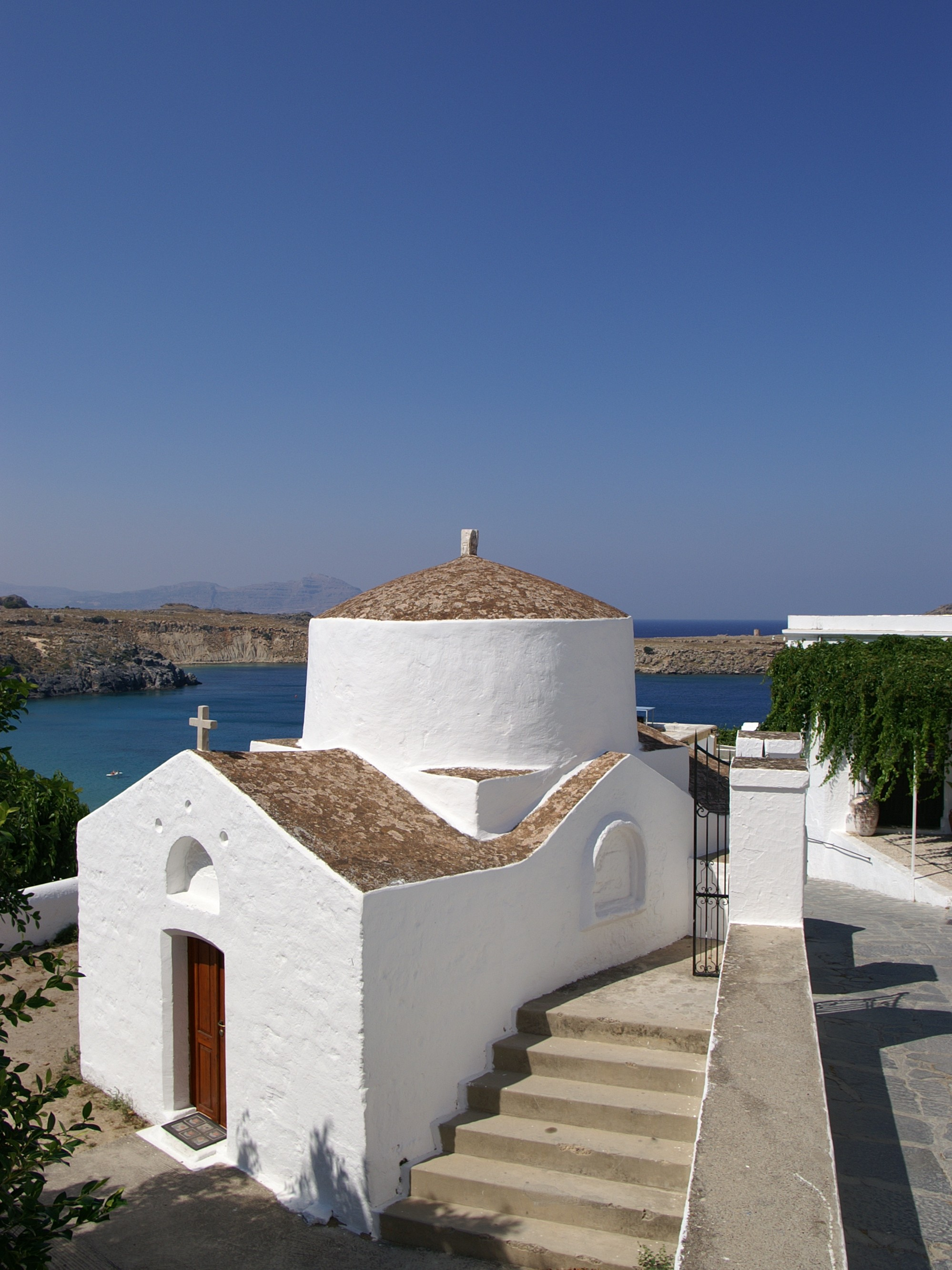
Chapel of Saint George Pachymachiotis

The Chapel of Saint George Pachymachiotis (Greek: Άγιος Γεώργιος Παχυμαχιώτης) is a chapel and a church in the Greek town of Lindos, in Rhodes, dedicated to Saint George.

The church was built in the late 14th century and it lies in the historical center of the ancient town of Lindos.

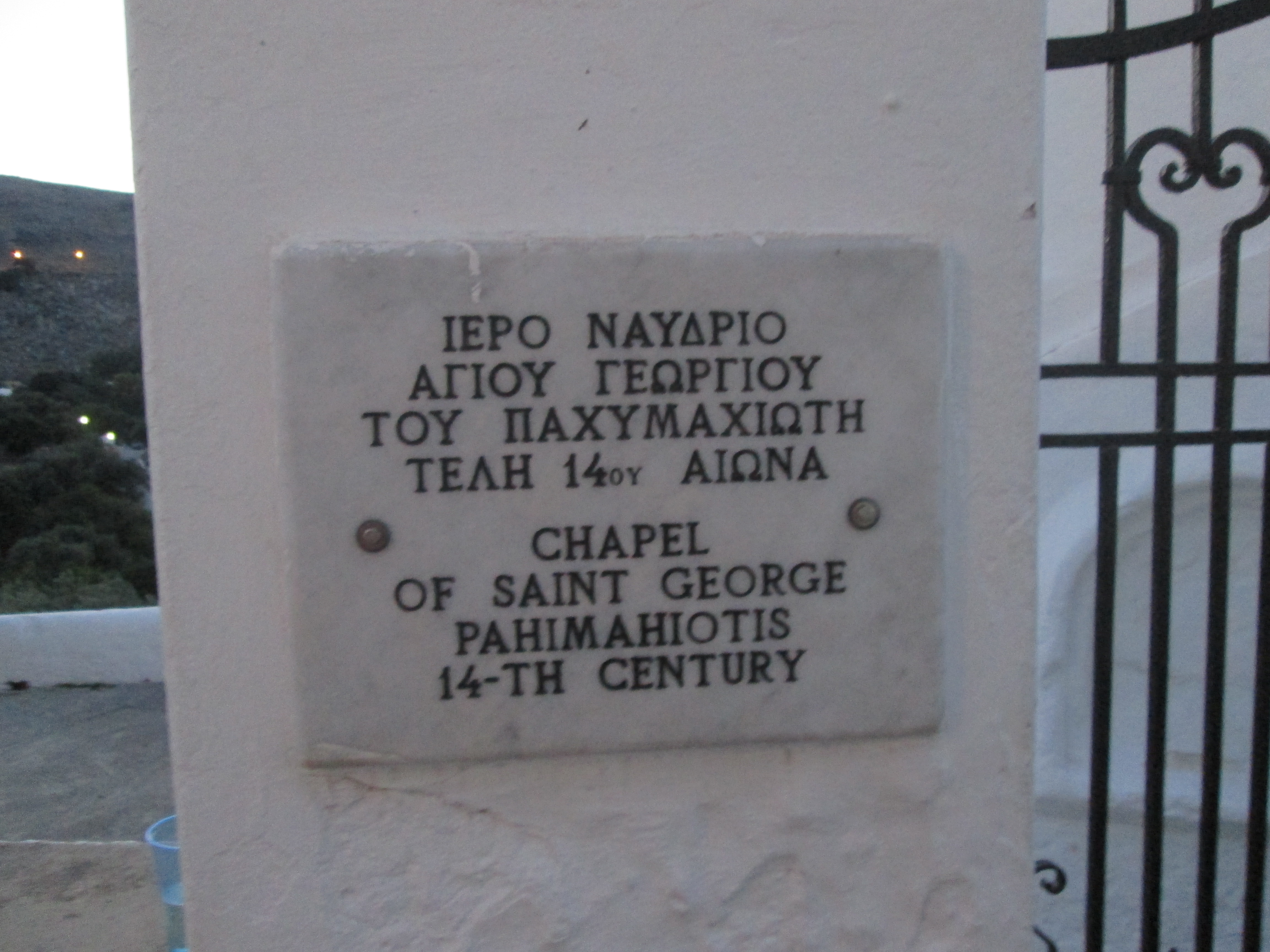
The nameplate out of the Chapel
