= Pefko, Messenia =

Pefko Πεύκο
- Community
- Location within Greece
- Coordinates: 37°12′25″N 22°04′45″E
- Country: Greece
- Administrative region: Peloponnese
- Regional unit: Messenia
- Municipality: Oichalia
- Municipal unit: Oichalia

Population (2021)
  - Community: 40
- Time zone: UTC+2 (EET)
  - Summer (DST): UTC+3 (EEST)

Pefko (Greek: Πεύκο meaning "pine tree", before 1958: Μπάλα - Bala) is a small, scenic village in the municipal unit of Oichalia, Messenia, Greece. It is situated in the northwestern foothills of the Taygetus Mountains, between Sparta and Kalamata.

== History ==
=== Name ===
The village used to be called "Μπαλα" or Balla meaning "ball" in local Greek dialect, but the name was changed as the government erroneously thought that the name was of Slavic origins. In actuality, Balla is a Greek word (of Italian origins) and the name of the village comes from a story involving a cannonball which saved the lives of those who would go on to found the village. According to local tradition, when the Ottoman Turks were coming to conquer the Peloponnesus, a cannon was brought to the city of Kalamata. It was prophesied that through this cannon the local Greeks would be saved. After the Ottoman Turks defeated the Byzantine Greek forces and their Venetian allies, some Greeks in desperation fired the cannon into the air. A priest told them that where this cannonball landed, they would find refuge. The cannonball was found in a small valley between two hills, and the village of Balla, which would later become Pefko, was founded there. The villagers named their town Balla after the cannonball that saved them from the Turks.

Indeed, whether or not the myth of the village's founding is true, the location of Balla/Pefko saved it from Turkish occupation. The orientation of the village was very strategic, as it is hidden between two rises making it very hard for the Turks and other occupiers to find. Balla/Pefko was a major center of guerrilla resistance activities against both the Turks and the Germans, the latter who found the village and burned it due to the villager's activities in resisting the Nazi occupation. The village was also partially destroyed in the 1970s due to rockslides, but later rebuilt.

=== Nikitaras and Perdios ===
Nikitaras, a hero of the Greek Revolution known as "Τουρκοφαγοuς" orTourkophagos or "eater of Turks" successfully hid in Balla when they were being hunted by the authorities. The old stone houses where the heroes stayed still stands. It is owned by the Niarhos family, having miraculously survived both German attacks and rockslides so far.

== Economic activities ==
Agriculture, specifically olive farming, is the main economic activity in the village. Raising sheep and goats has also been a traditional form of economic activity for villagers. Lack of economic opportunities has led to emigration from the village, mainly to larger Greek cities such as Kalamata, Patras and Athens.
