= Lartos, Rhodes =

Lartos was an ancient village on the southeast coast of Rhodes. There is a major marble formation nearby, lithos lartios, a gray-blue stone distinctive of the island, quarried in antiquity largely for local use.
