= Lindos =

Lindos Λίνδος
- Municipal unit
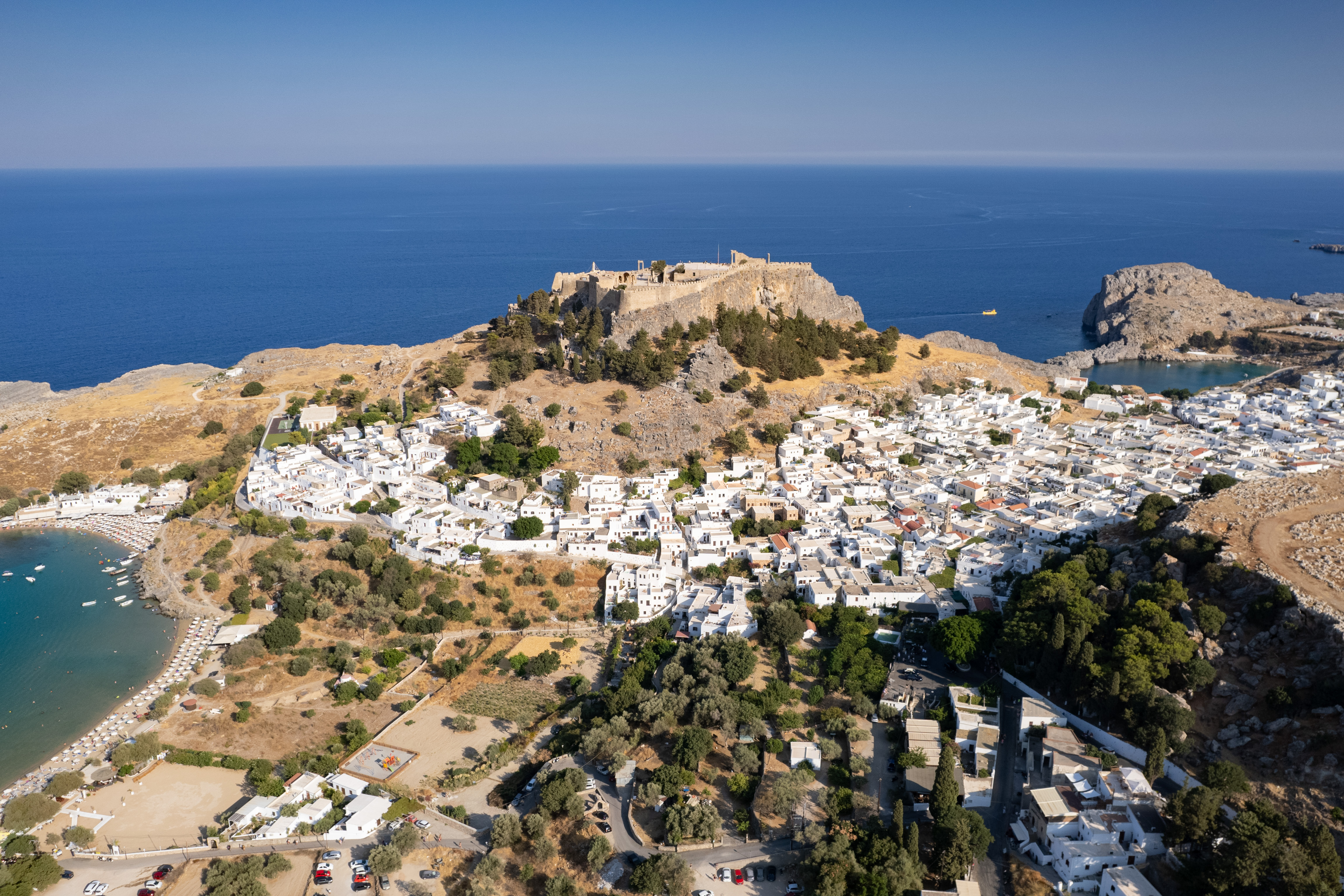
- Aerial view of Lindos

- Location within Rhodes

- Location within Greece
- Coordinates: 36°05′N 28°05′E
- Country: Greece
- Administrative region: South Aegean
- Regional unit: Rhodes

Area
  - Municipal unit: 178.9 km^{2} (69.1 sq mi)
- Highest elevation: 5 m (16 ft)
- Lowest elevation: 0 m (0 ft)

Population (2021)
  - Municipal unit: 4,496
  - Municipal unit density: 25.13/km^{2} (65.09/sq mi)
  - Community: 1,096
- Time zone: UTC+2 (EET)
  - Summer (DST): UTC+3 (EEST)
- Postal code: 851 07
- Area code: 22440
- Vehicle registration: ΚΧ, ΡΟ, ΡΚ

Lindos (/ˈlɪndɒs/; Ancient Greek: Λίνδος) is an archaeological site, a fishing village and a former municipality on the island of Rhodes, in the Dodecanese, Greece. Since the 2011 local government reform, it is part of the municipality Rhodes, of which it is a municipal unit. The municipal unit has an area of 178.9 km^{2}. It lies on the east coast of the island. It is about 40 km south of the city of Rhodes and its fine beaches make it a popular tourist and holiday destination. Lindos is situated in a large bay and faces the fishing village and small resort of Charaki.

== History ==
According to myth, Lindos was founded by the Dorians led by the king Tlepolemus of Rhodes, who arrived in about the 10th century BC. It was one of six Dorian cities in the area known as the Dorian Hexapolis. The eastern location of Rhodes made it a natural meeting place between the Greeks and the Phoenicians, and by the 8th century Lindos was a major trading centre. In the 6th century it was ruled by Cleobulus, one of the Seven Sages of Greece. The importance of Lindos declined after the founding of the city of Rhodes in the late 5th century BC.

In classical times the acropolis of Lindos was dominated by the massive temple of Athena Lindia, which attained its final form in around 300 BC. In Hellenistic and Roman times the temple precinct grew as more buildings were added. In early medieval times these buildings fell into disuse, and in the 14th century they were partly overlaid by a large fortress built on the acropolis by the Knights of St John to defend the island against the Ottomans.

== Acropolis ==
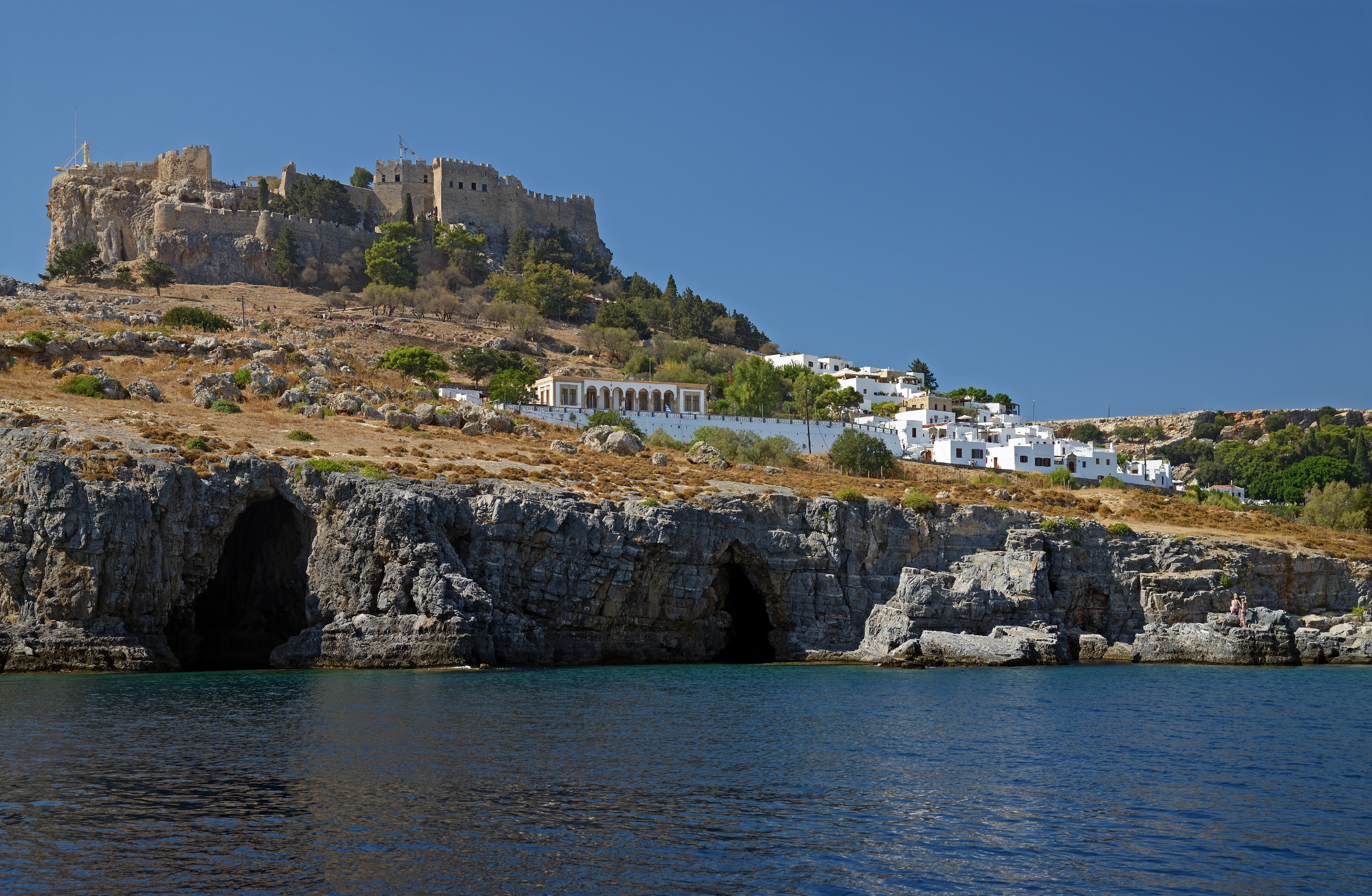
The acropolis

Above the modern town rises the acropolis of Lindos, a natural citadel which was fortified successively by the Greeks, the Romans, the Byzantines, the Knights of St John and the Ottomans. This makes the site difficult to excavate and interpret archaeologically. The acropolis has views of the surrounding harbours and coastline.

On the acropolis of Lindos today parts of the following buildings may still be seen:

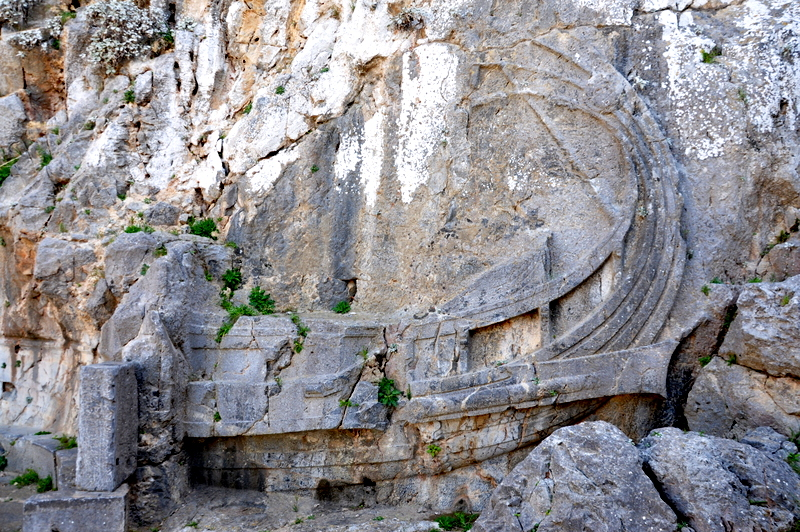
Rhodian trireme

- The Doric Temple of Athena Lindia, dating from about 300 BC, built on the site of an earlier temple. Inside the temple is the table of offerings and the base of the cult statue of Athena.
- The Propylaea of the Sanctuary, also dating from the 4th century BC. A monumental staircase leads to a D-shaped stoa and a wall with five door openings.
- The Hellenistic stoa with lateral projecting wings, dating from about 200 BC. The stoa was 87 metres long and consisted of 42 columns.
- The well-known relief of a Rhodian trireme (warship) cut into the rock at the foot of the steps leading to the acropolis. On the bow stood a statue of General Hagesander, the work of the sculptor Pythokritos. The relief dates from about 180 BC.
- The Hellenistic staircase (2nd century BC) leading to the main archaeological area of the acropolis.
- Remains of a Roman temple, possibly dedicated to the Emperor Diocletian and dating from about 300 AD.
- The Acropolis is surrounded by a Hellenistic wall contemporary with the Propylaea and the stairway leading to the entrance to the site. A Roman inscription says that the wall and square towers were repaired at the expense of P Aelius Hagetor, the priest of Athena in the 2nd century AD.
- The Castle of the Knights of St John, built some time before 1317 on the foundations of older Byzantine fortifications. The walls and towers follow the natural conformation of the cliff. A pentagonal tower on the south side commanded the harbour, the settlement and the road from the south of the island. There was a large round tower on the east facing the sea and two more, one round and the other on a corner, on the northeast side of the enceinte. Today one of the towers at the southwest corner and one to the west survive.
- The Greek Orthodox Church of St John, dating from the 13th or 14th century and built on the ruins of a previous church, which may have been built as early as the 6th century.

Some scenes of the well-known film The Guns of Navarone were filmed here.

== Gallery (Acropolis) ==
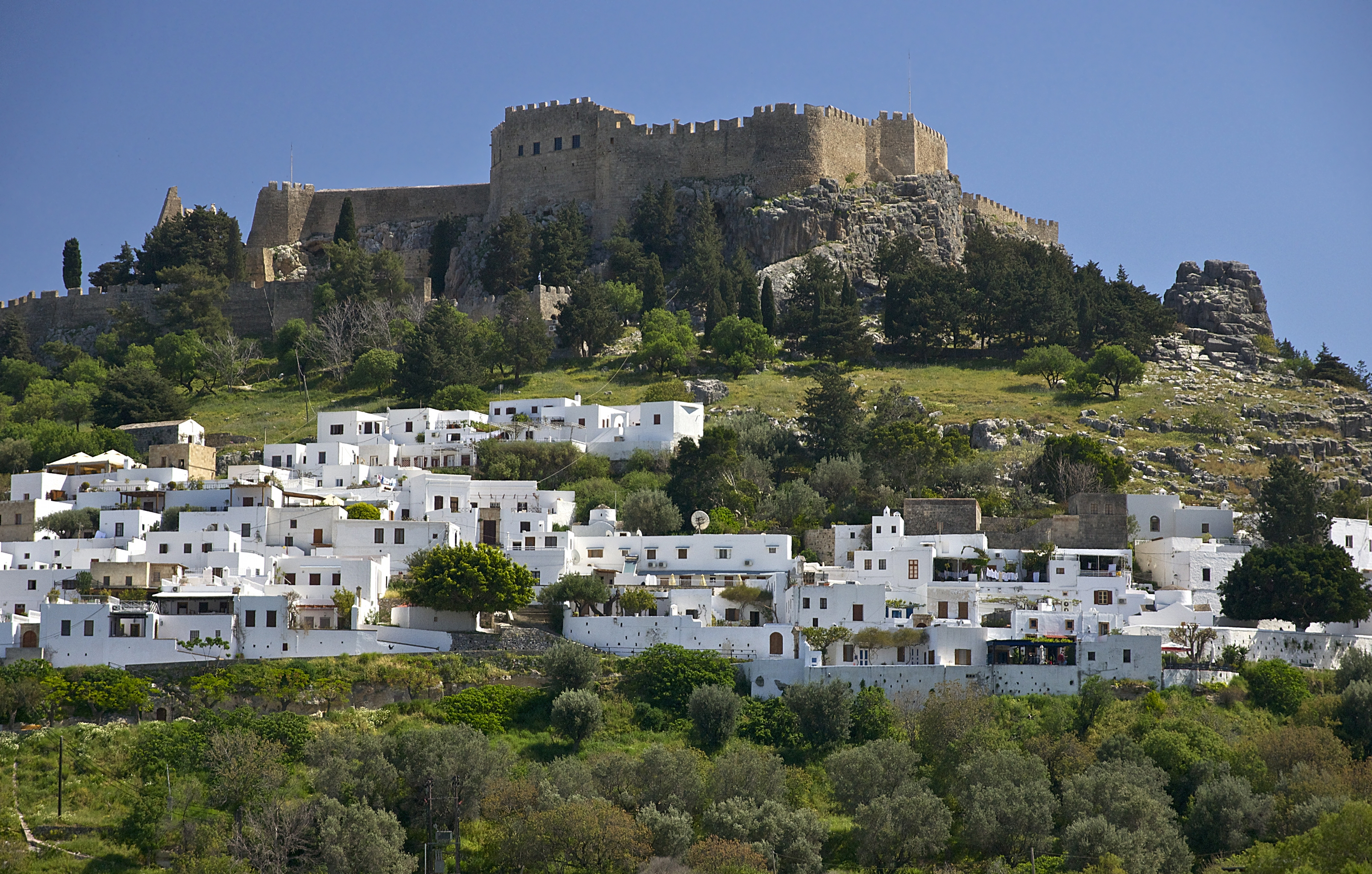
View to the Acropolis

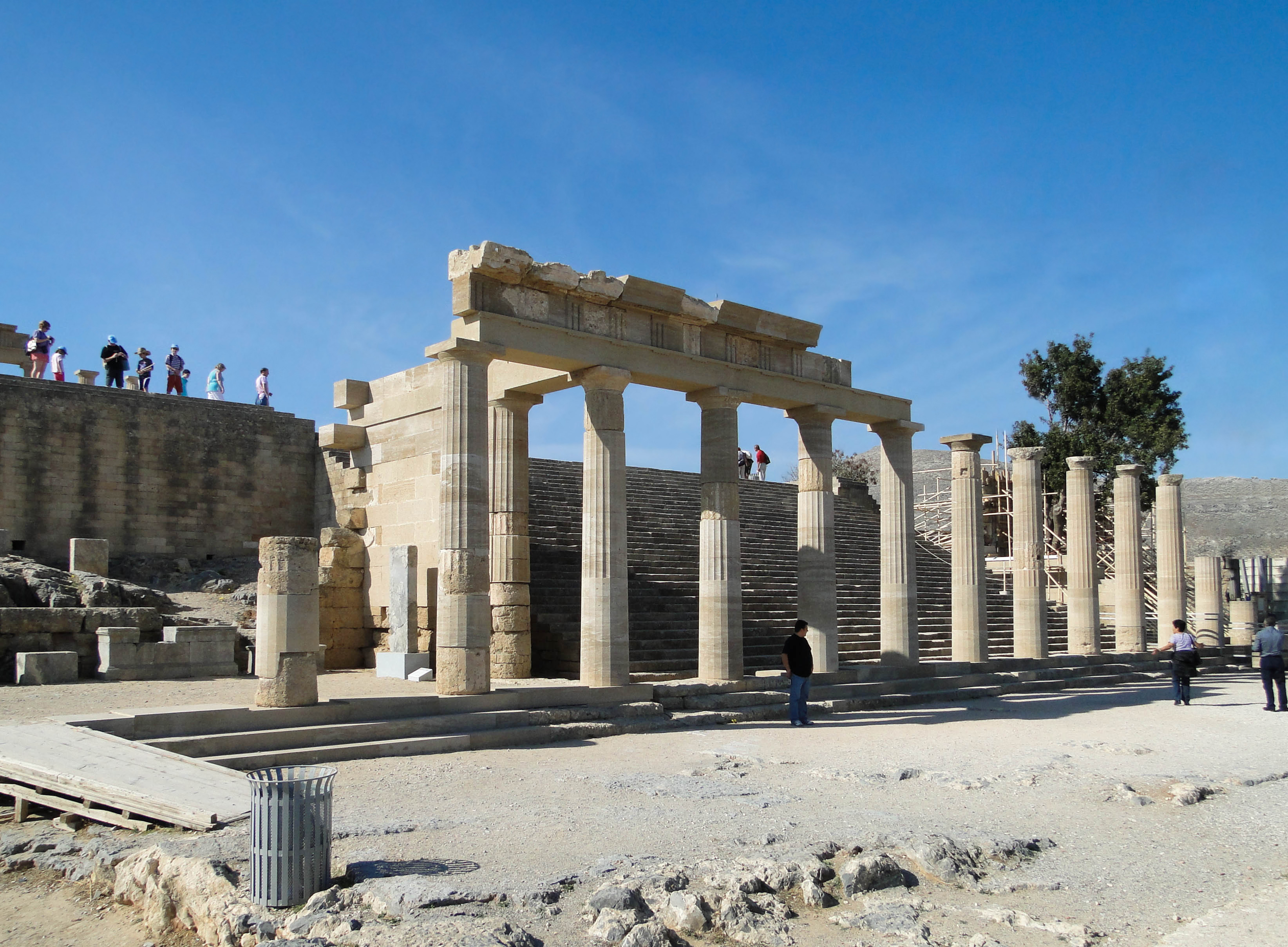
Staircase of the Propylaea

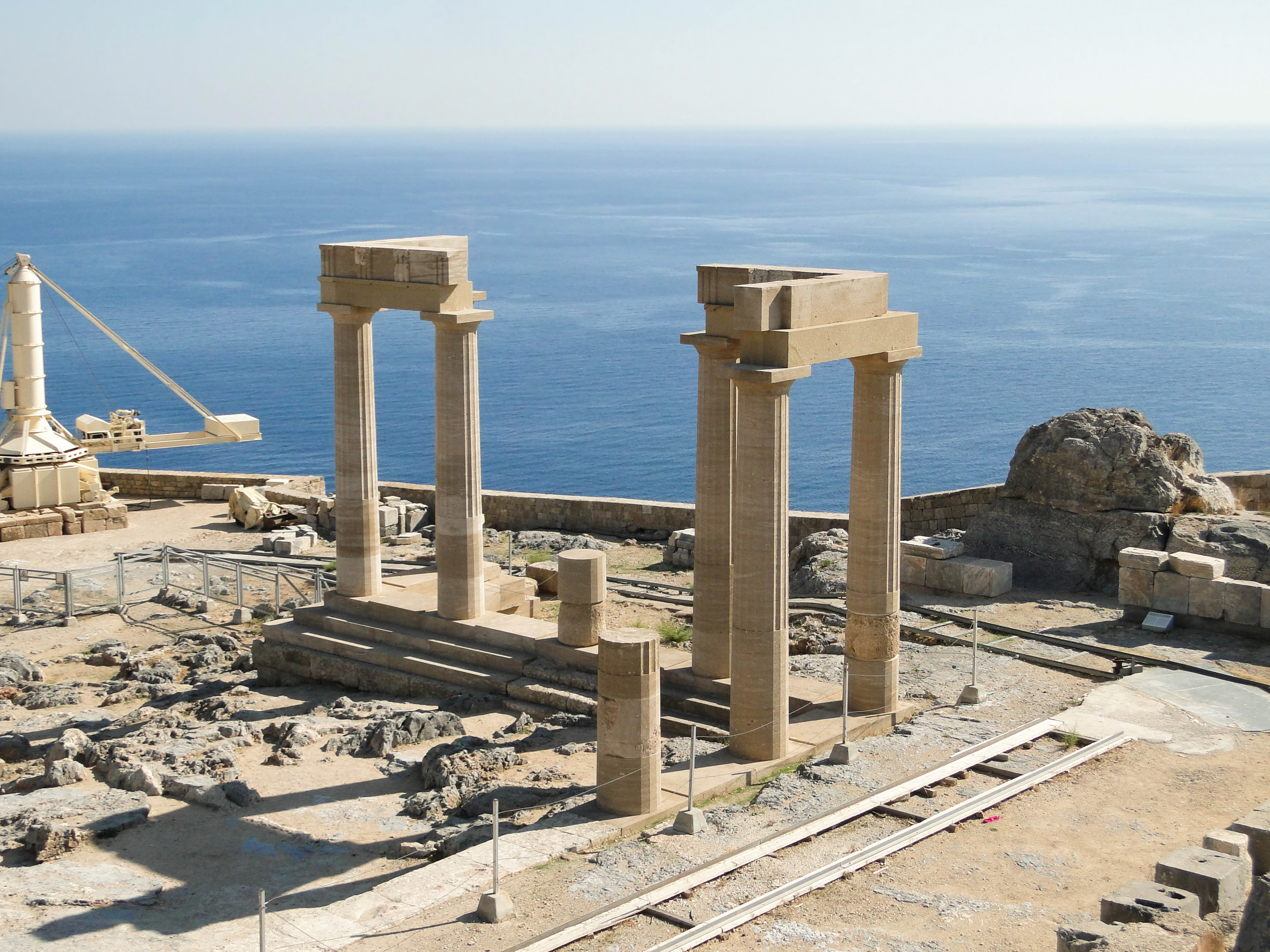
Columns of the Hellenistic stoa

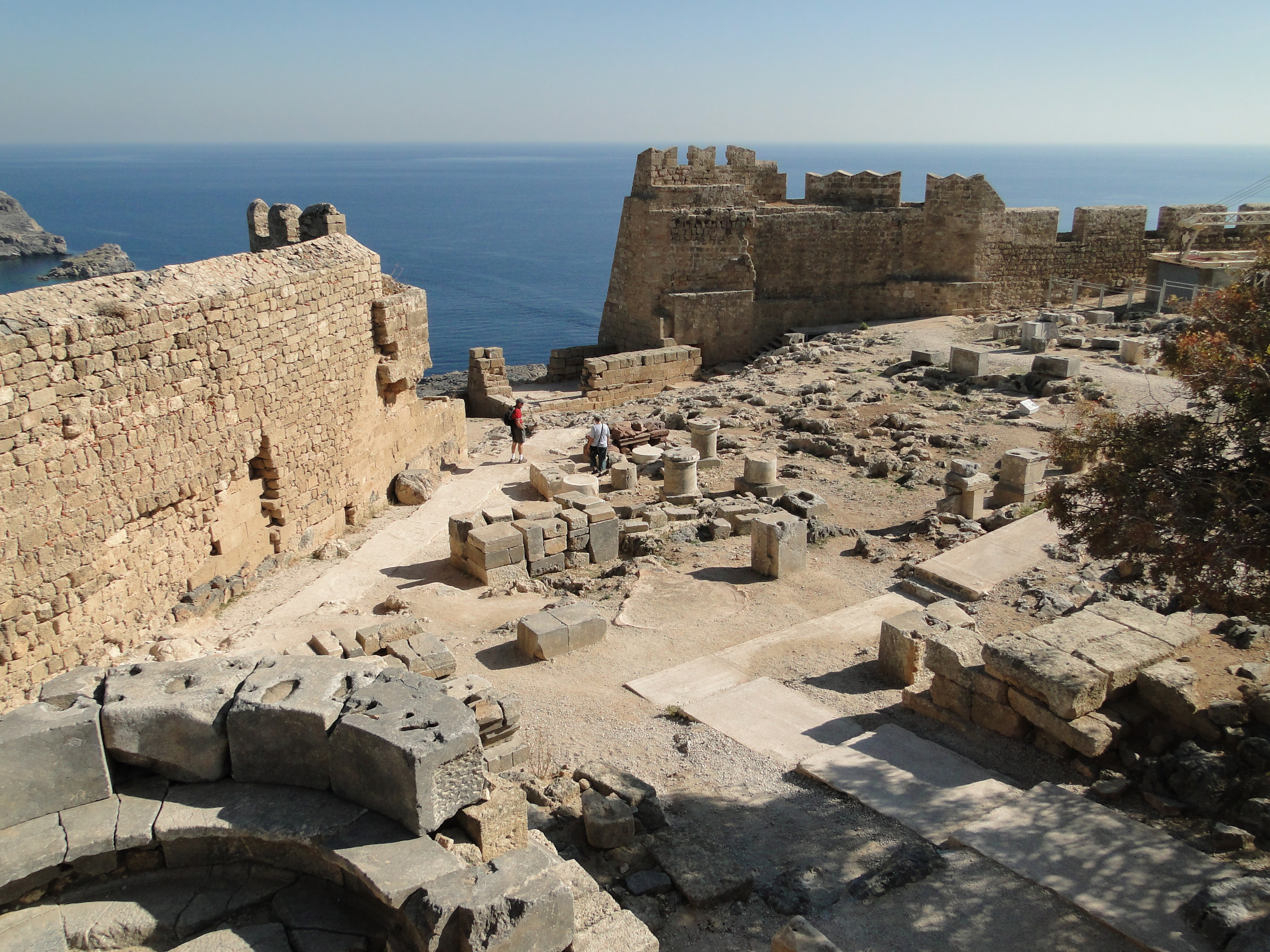
View of the summit of the Acropolis

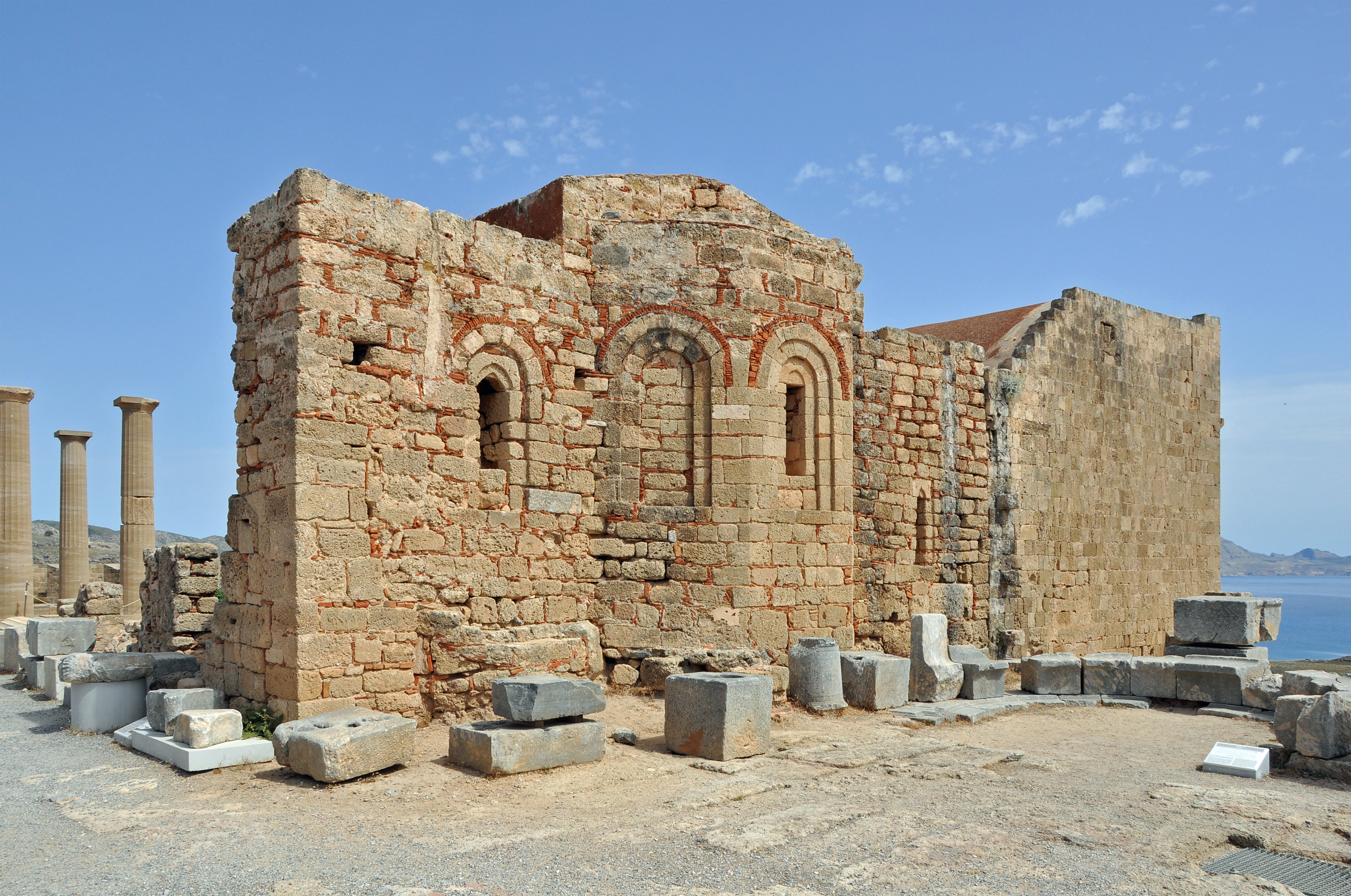
Church of St. John on the Acropolis

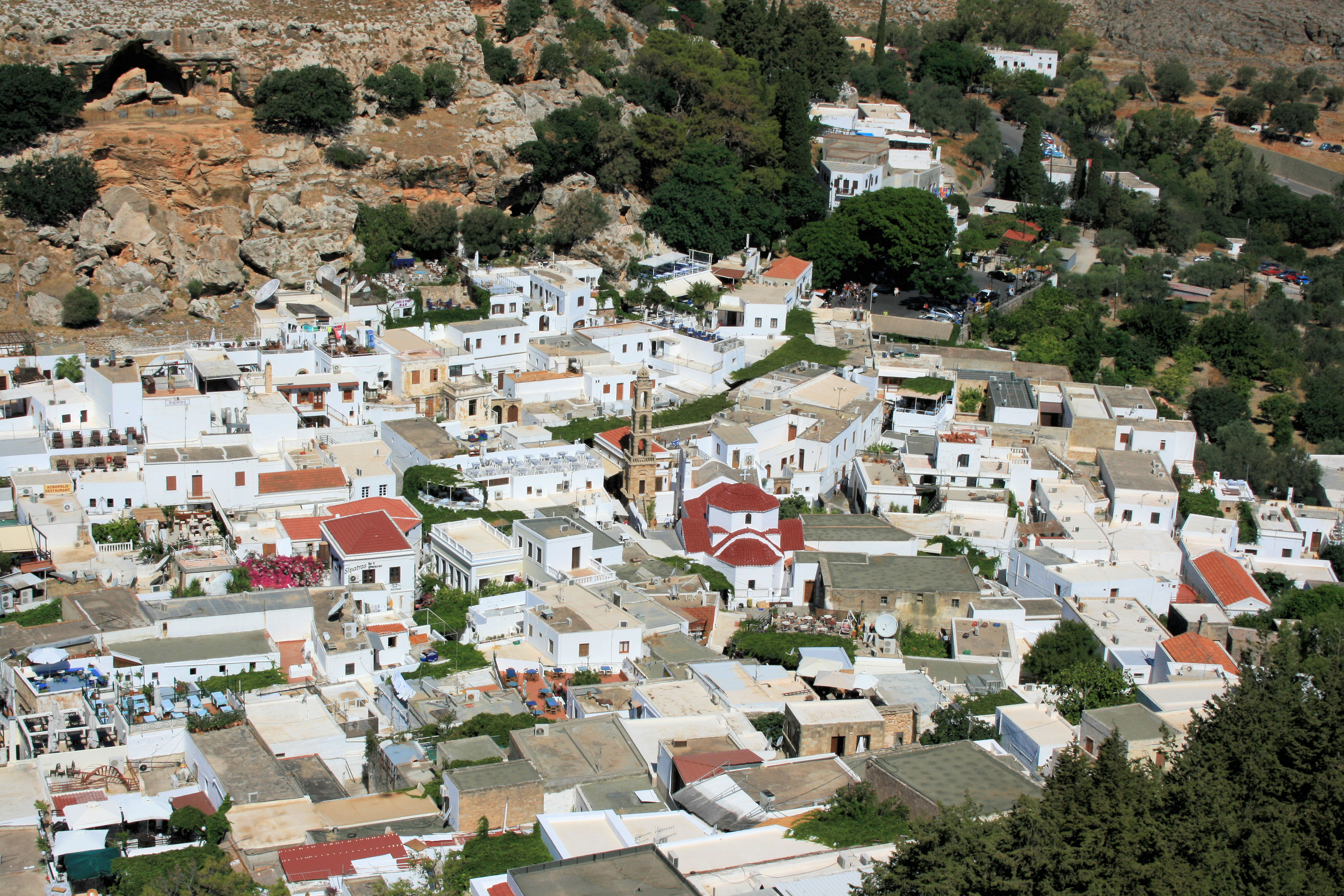
Panoramic view

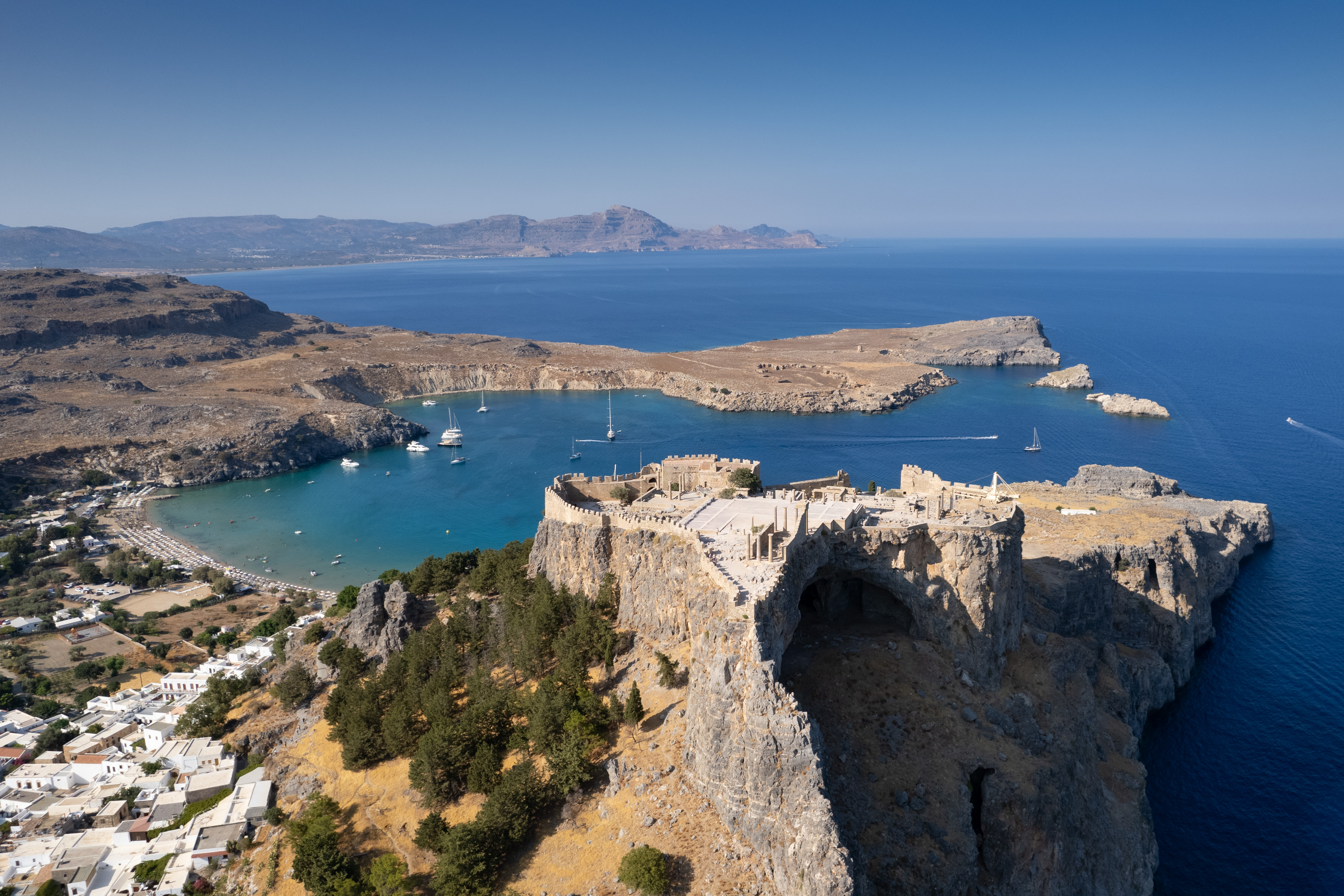
Aerial view

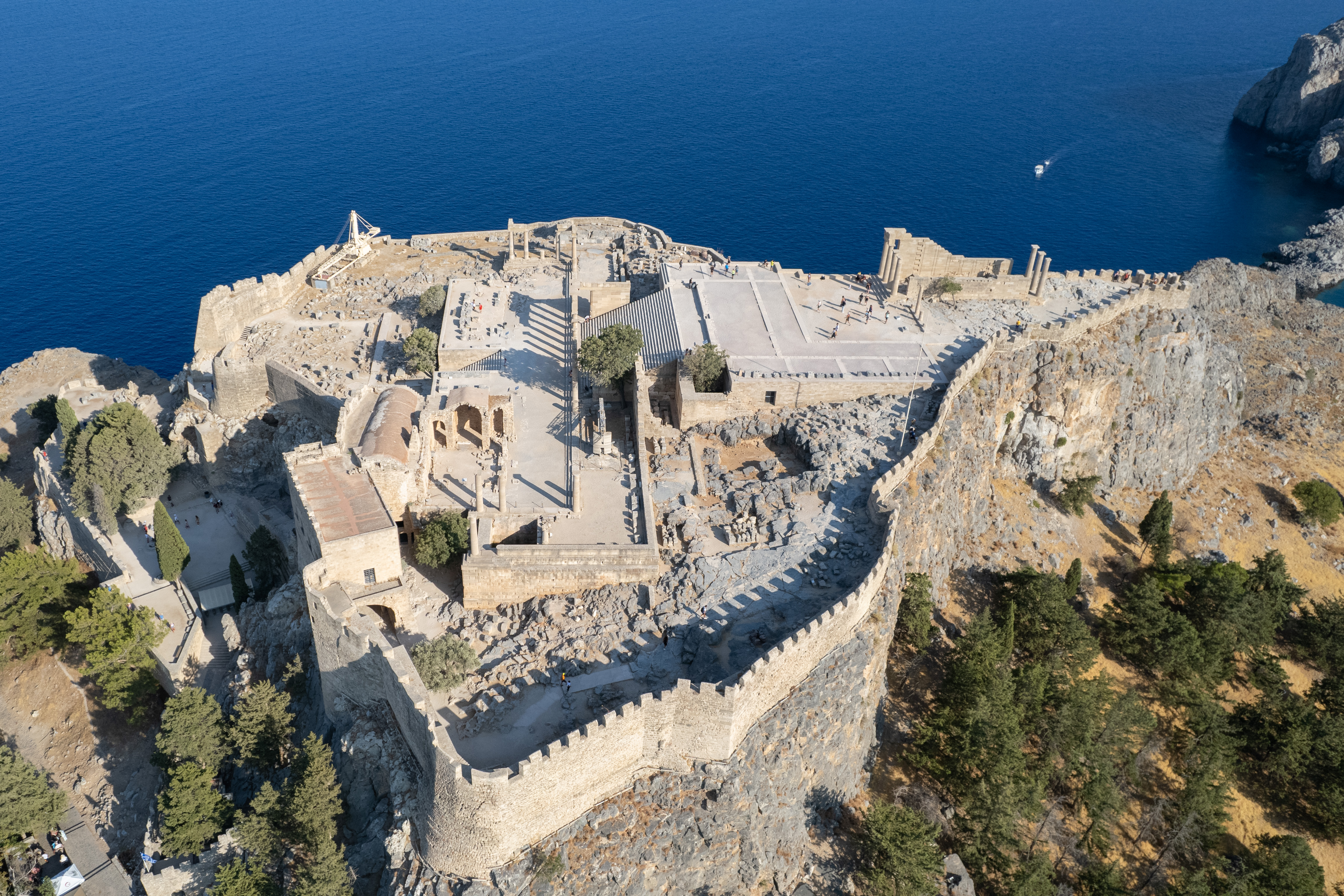
Aerial view

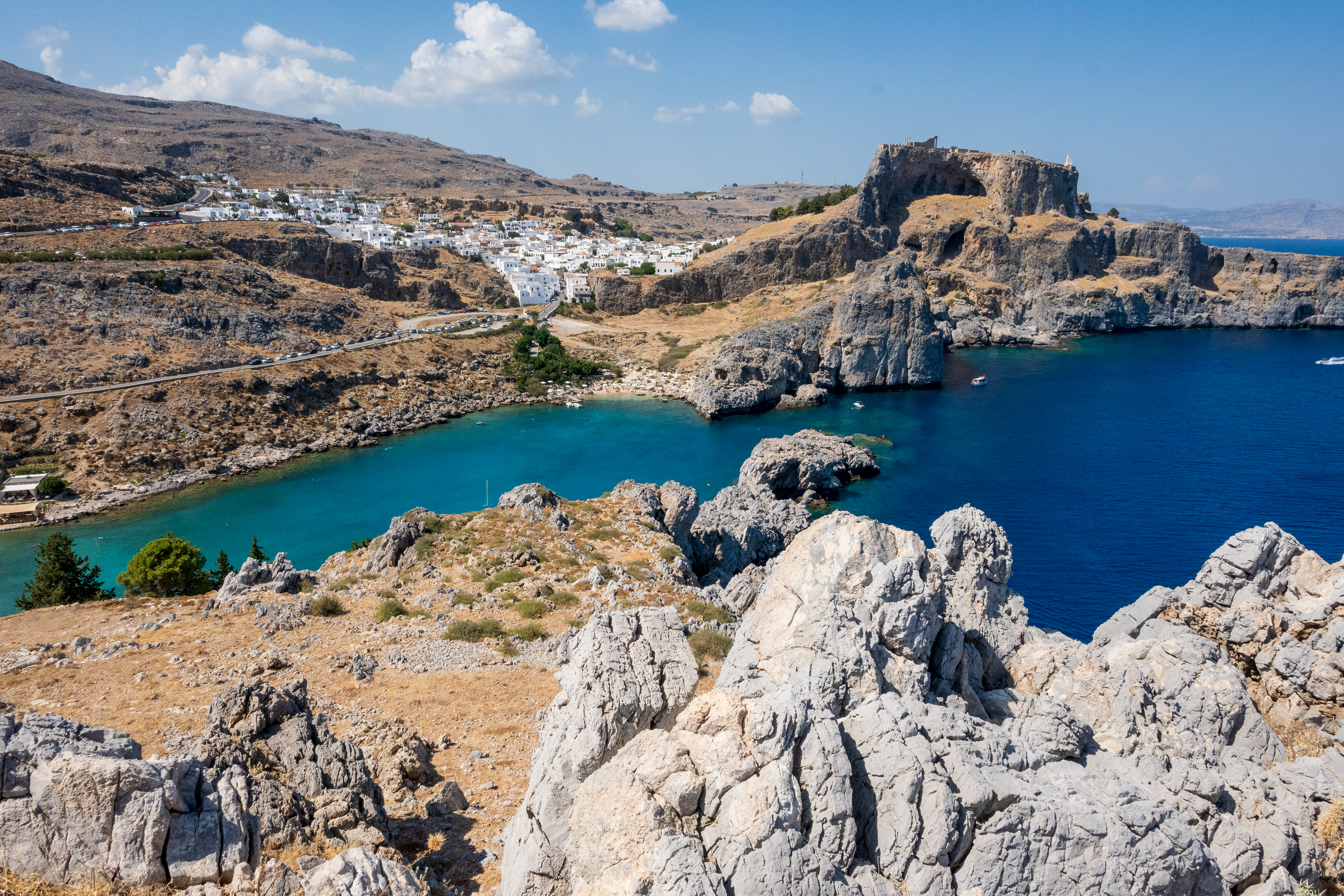
Lindos and St. Paul's Bay

== Excavations ==
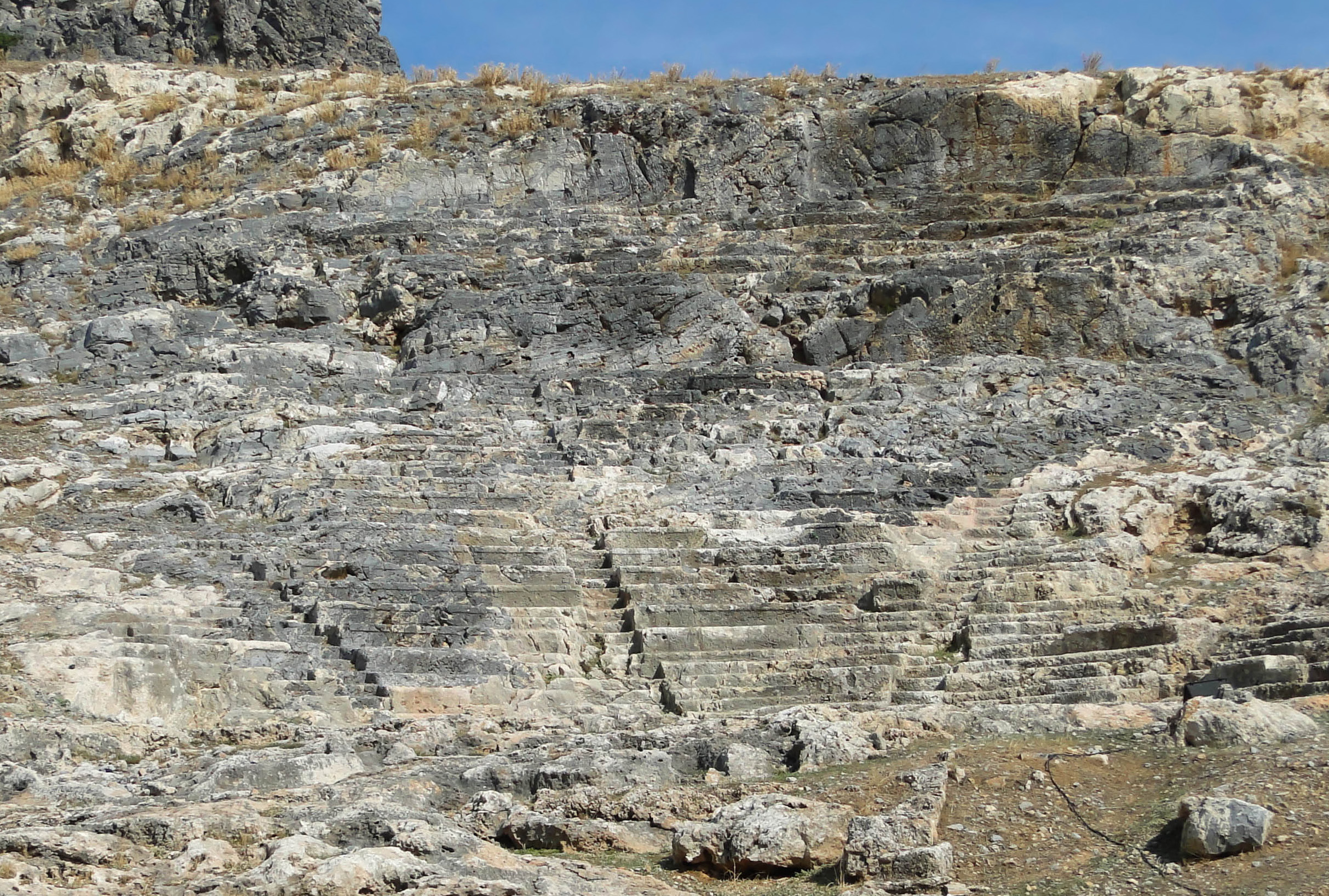
Ancient Greek theatre of Lindos

Excavations were carried out at Lindos in the years 1900 to 1914 by the Carlsberg Institute of Denmark, directed by Karl Frederik Kinch and Christian Blinkenberg. The acropolis site was excavated down to bedrock and the foundations of all the buildings were uncovered.

During the Italian occupation of the island (1912–1945) major restoration work was carried out on the Lindos acropolis, but it was poorly done and was harmful to the historic record. The north-east side of the Temple of Athena was restored. The monumental staircase to the propylaea was rebuilt and many of the columns of the Hellenistic stoa were re-erected. Large surfaces were covered with concrete. Bases and inscribed blocks were taken from their locations and placed along the restored walls.

Judged by modern standards, this work took insufficient note of the evidence available from the excavations and in its methods did damage to the remains themselves. In recent years Greek and international archaeologists under the supervision of the Greek Ministry of Culture have been working to restore and protect the ancient buildings on the site.

== Climate ==
Lindos has a Mediterranean climate (Köppen: Csa) strongly influenced by the Mediterranean Sea. Lindos has mild winters and particularly hot and dry summers while rain falls mostly in the winter. Lindos has an annual average temperature of 22 °C (72 °F) and is Greece's warmest area annually. On average Lindos records 6.1 days each year with minimum temperatures over 30.0 °C.

In August 2021, the National Observatory of Athens station in Lindos registered the all-time highest mean monthly temperature in Europe. Also, during the summer of 2024, Lindos recorded the highest average summer temperature in Europe with 32.0 °C (89.6 °F). Moreover, according to the Hellenic National Meteorological Service SE Rhodes, where Lindos is near, registers the highest mean annual sunshine in Greece with over 3.100 hours.

Climate data for Lindos 65 m a.s.l.
Month	Jan	Feb	Mar	Apr	May	Jun	Jul	Aug	Sep	Oct	Nov	Dec	Year
Record high °C (°F)	21.9 (71.4)	24.8 (76.6)	25.9 (78.6)	32.4 (90.3)	36.2 (97.2)	43.6 (110.5)	43.6 (110.5)	43.1 (109.6)	39.8 (103.6)	37.9 (100.2)	27.2 (81.0)	22.5 (72.5)	43.6 (110.5)
Mean daily maximum °C (°F)	16.4 (61.5)	16.9 (62.4)	18.7 (65.7)	22.4 (72.3)	26.8 (80.2)	32 (90)	35.4 (95.7)	35 (95)	31.6 (88.9)	26.6 (79.9)	22.1 (71.8)	18.3 (64.9)	25.2 (77.4)
Daily mean °C (°F)	13.8 (56.8)	14.2 (57.6)	15.8 (60.4)	19 (66)	23.1 (73.6)	28.1 (82.6)	31.5 (88.7)	31.4 (88.5)	28.2 (82.8)	23.6 (74.5)	19.5 (67.1)	15.7 (60.3)	22.0 (71.6)
Mean daily minimum °C (°F)	11.3 (52.3)	11.6 (52.9)	12.9 (55.2)	15.6 (60.1)	19.5 (67.1)	24.2 (75.6)	27.6 (81.7)	27.8 (82.0)	24.8 (76.6)	20.6 (69.1)	16.9 (62.4)	13.2 (55.8)	18.8 (65.9)
Record low °C (°F)	1.1 (34.0)	3.3 (37.9)	3.1 (37.6)	9.4 (48.9)	13.8 (56.8)	16.8 (62.2)	21.1 (70.0)	24.0 (75.2)	16.3 (61.3)	13.1 (55.6)	8.8 (47.8)	4.3 (39.7)	1.1 (34.0)
Average rainfall mm (inches)	107.2 (4.22)	74.5 (2.93)	41.2 (1.62)	24.1 (0.95)	12.4 (0.49)	2.3 (0.09)	1.3 (0.05)	0 (0)	5.8 (0.23)	22.8 (0.90)	73 (2.9)	123.9 (4.88)	488.5 (19.26)
Source 1: National Observatory of Athens (May 2014-Nov 2025)
Source 2: World Meteorological Organization

== Gallery (town) ==
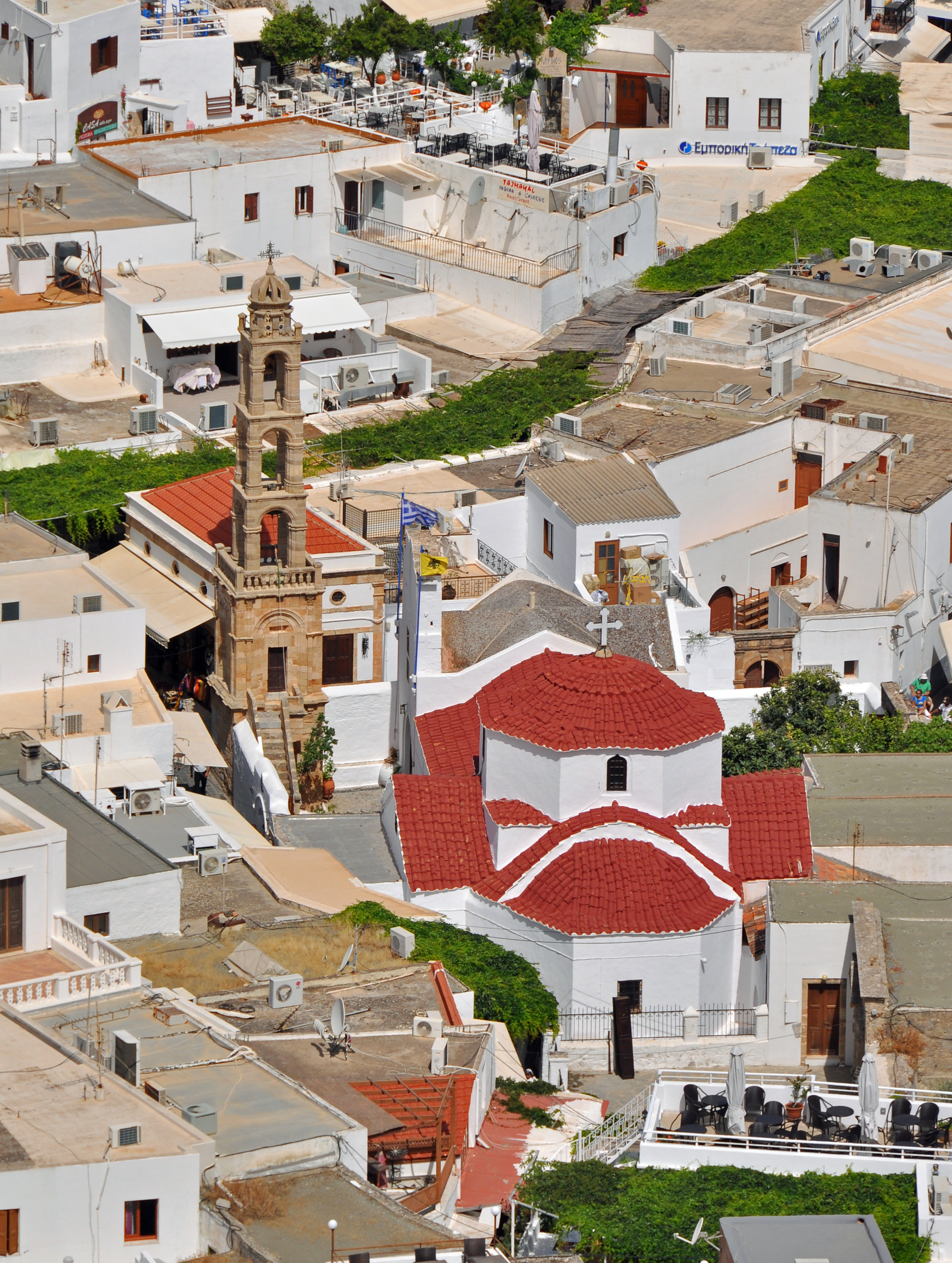
The Byzantine Panagia church with the belltower is located in the centre of the village

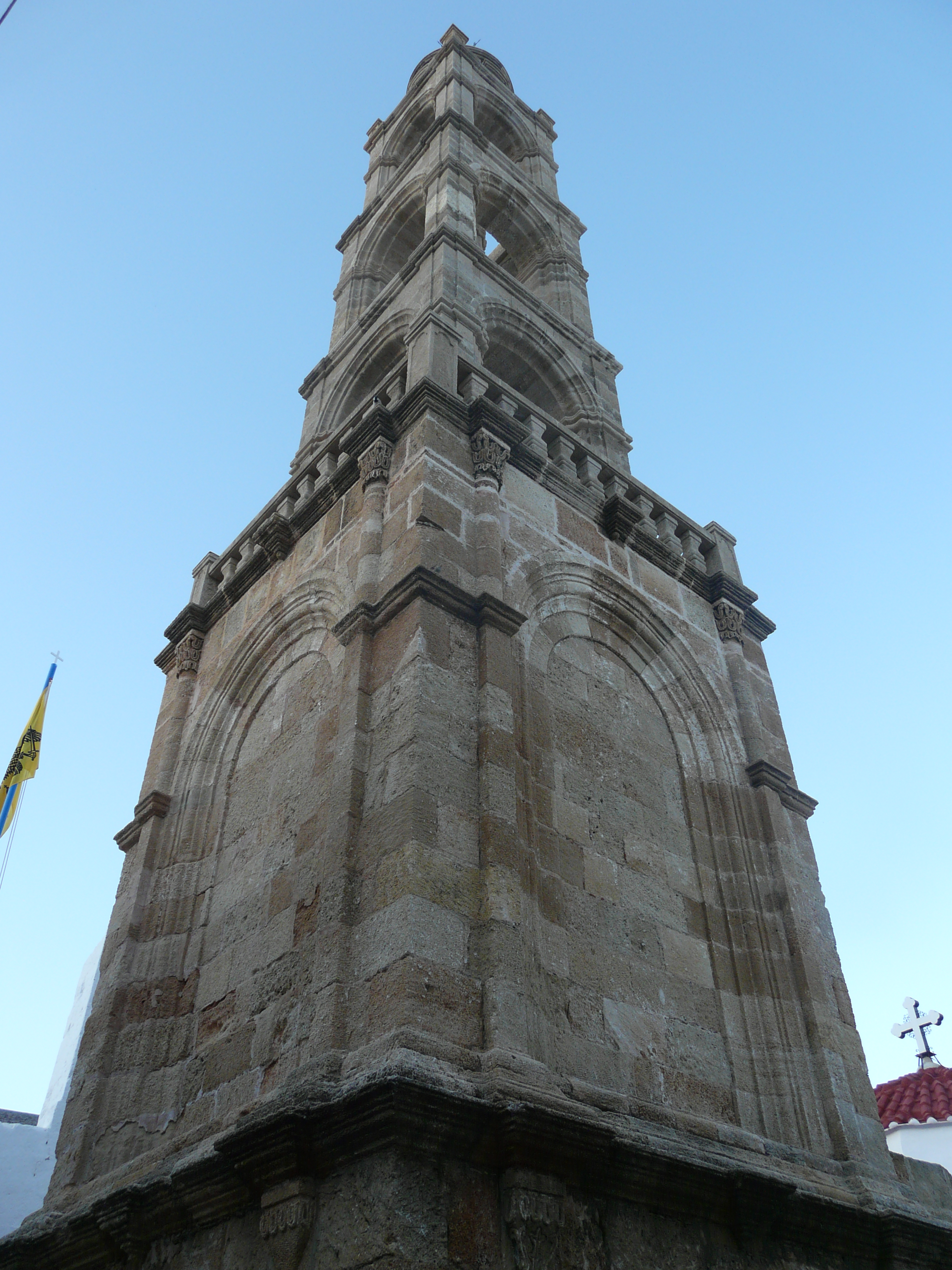
The belltower

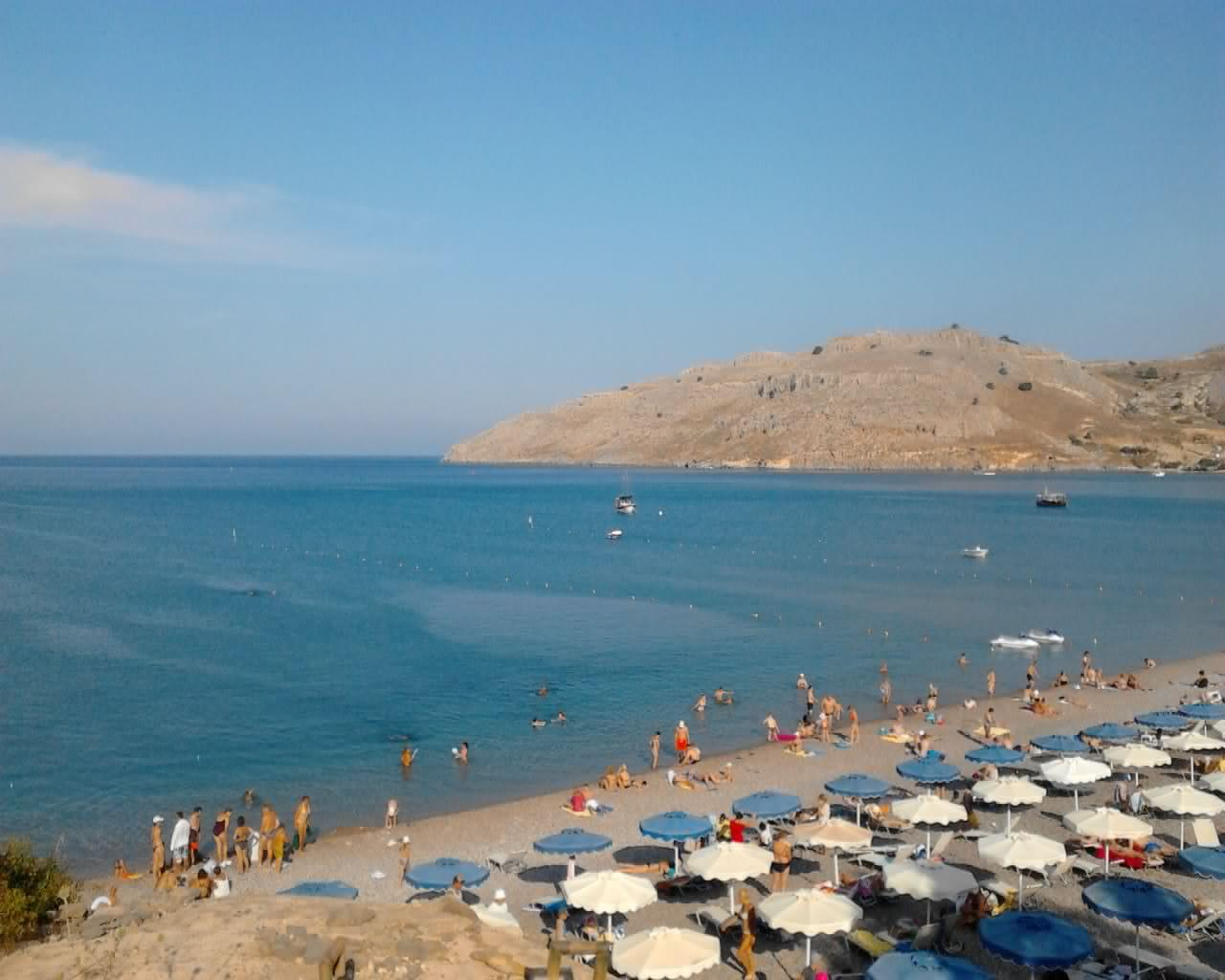
The beach of Vliha Bay

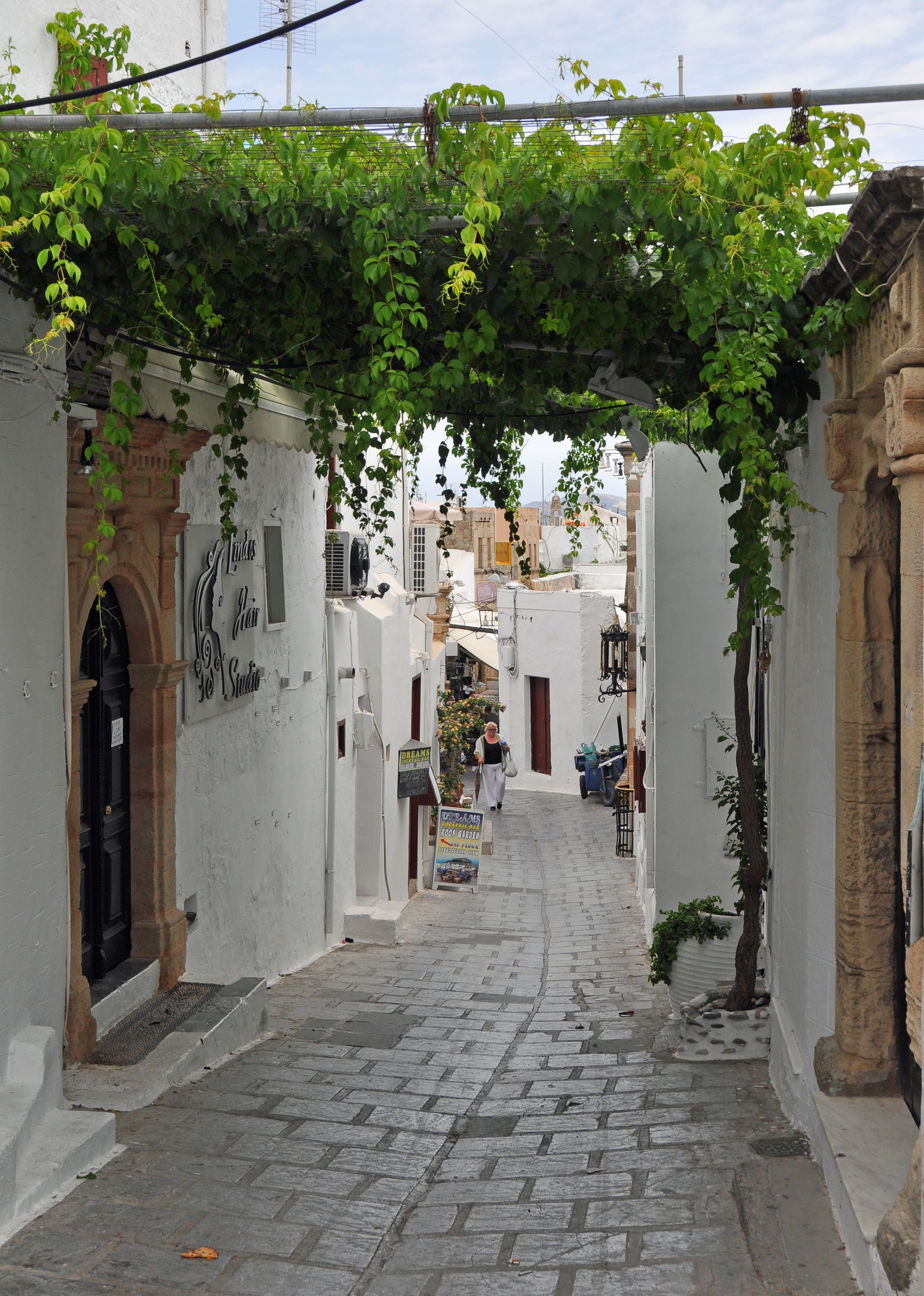
View of a street

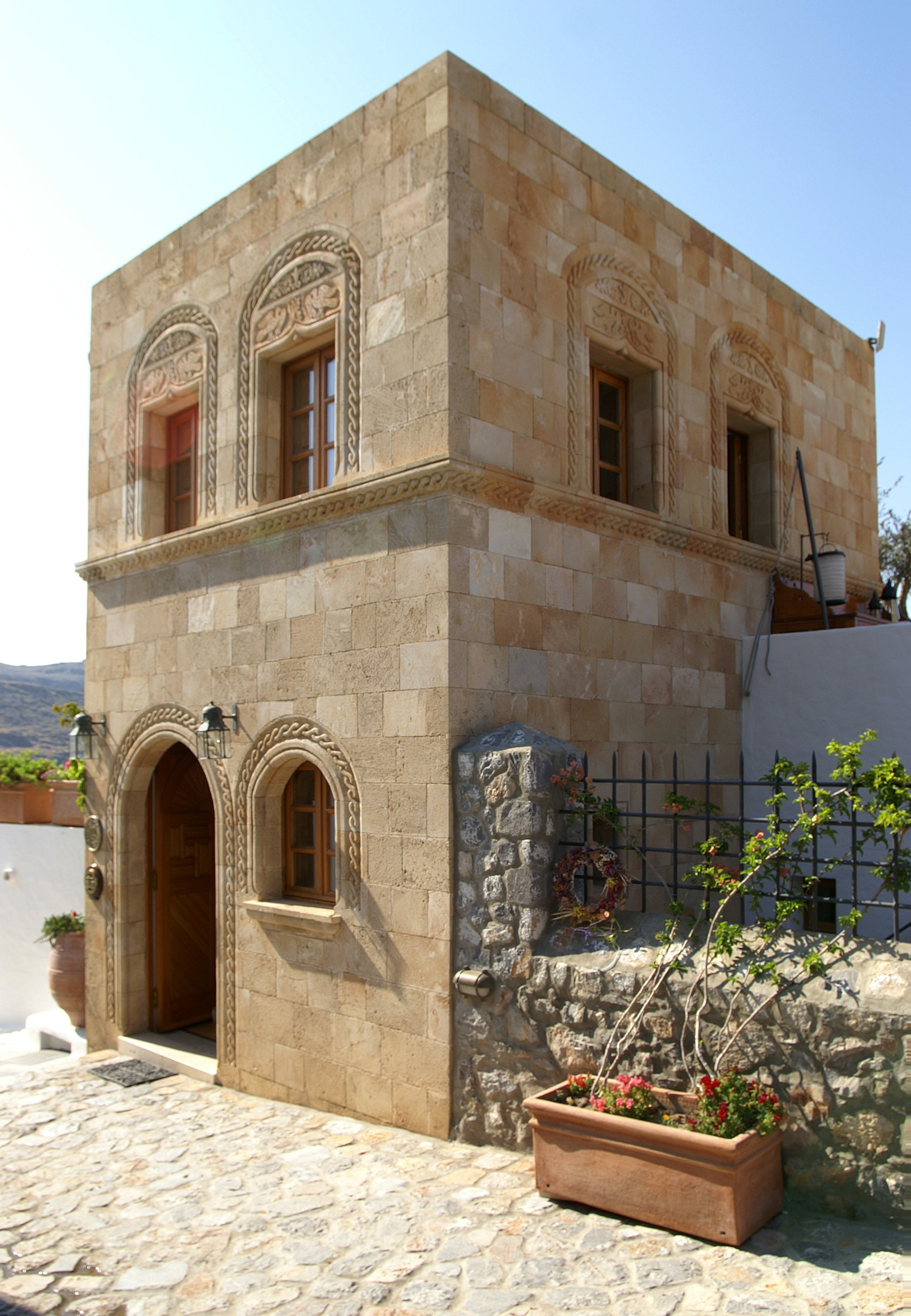
Old house

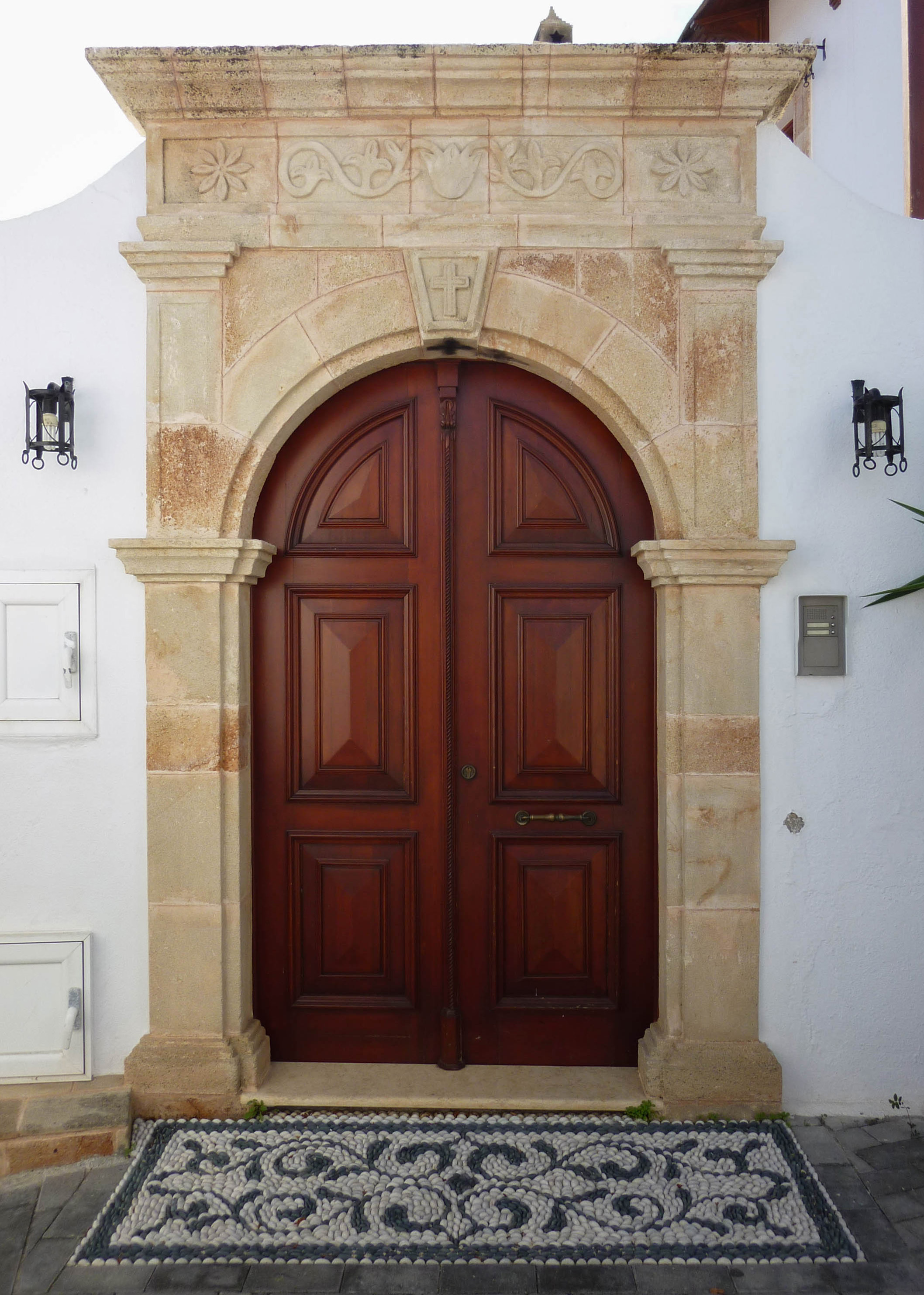
Door at the town

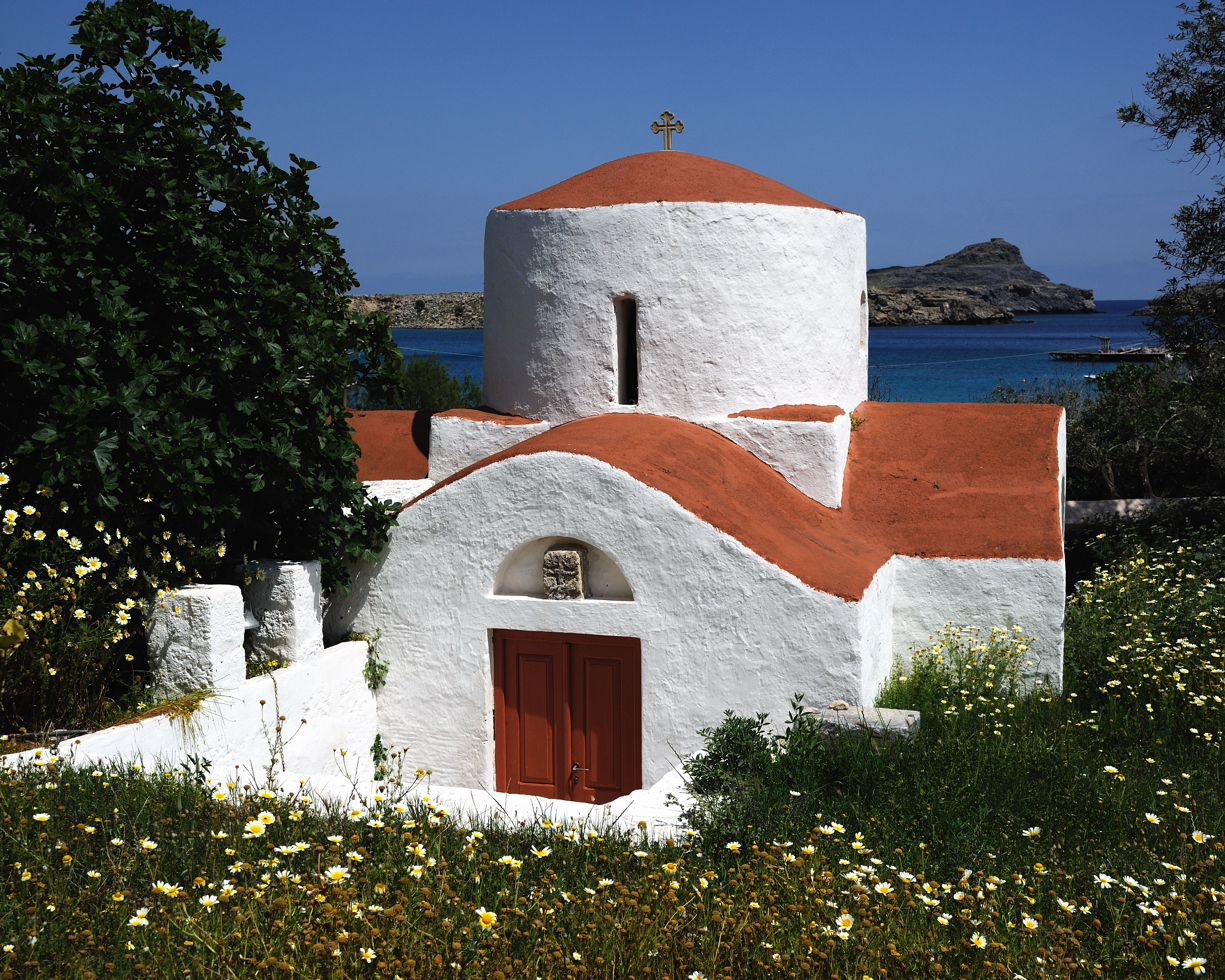
The 13th century Greek Orthodox Church of St Peter

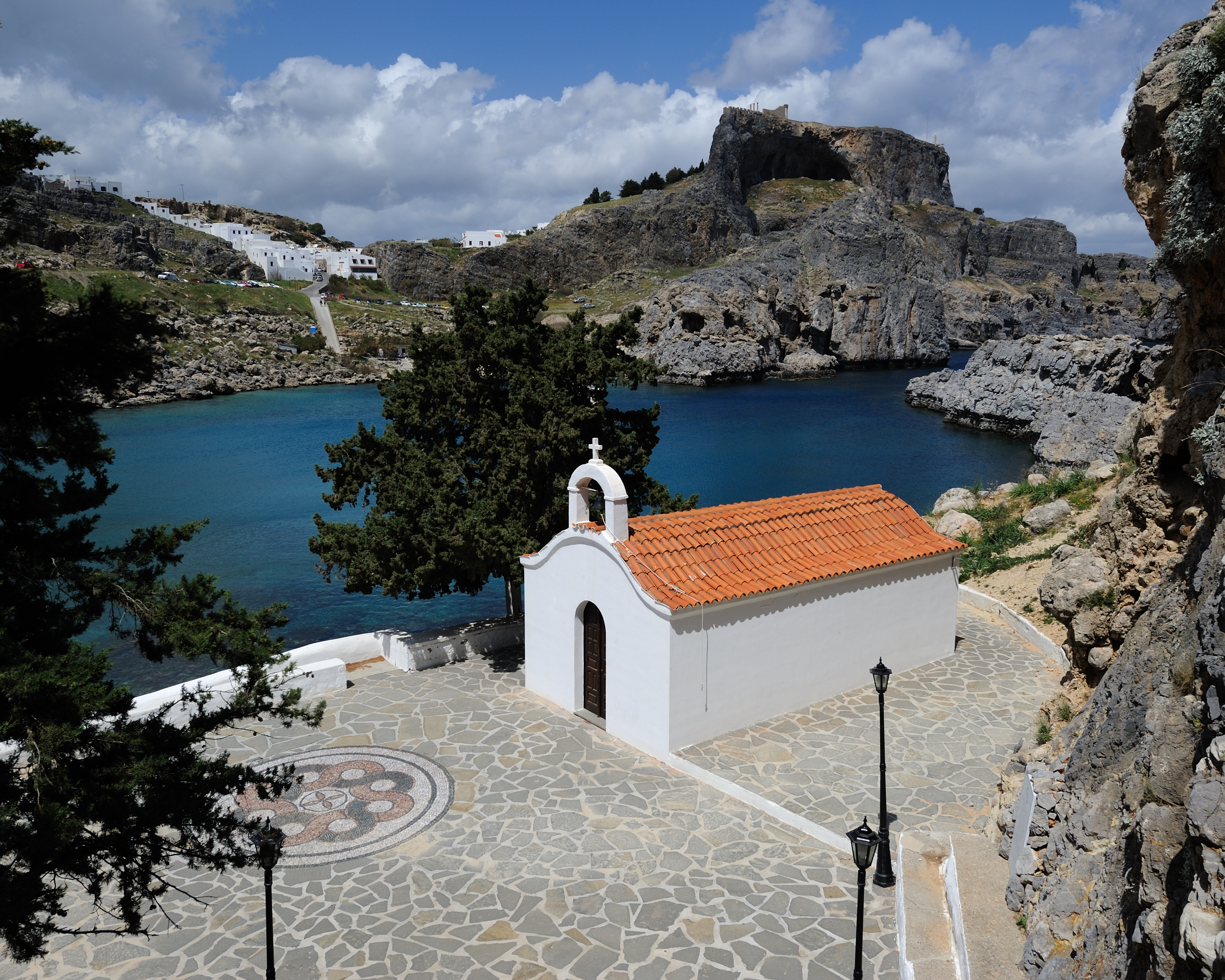
St Paul's church is now popular as a wedding chapel

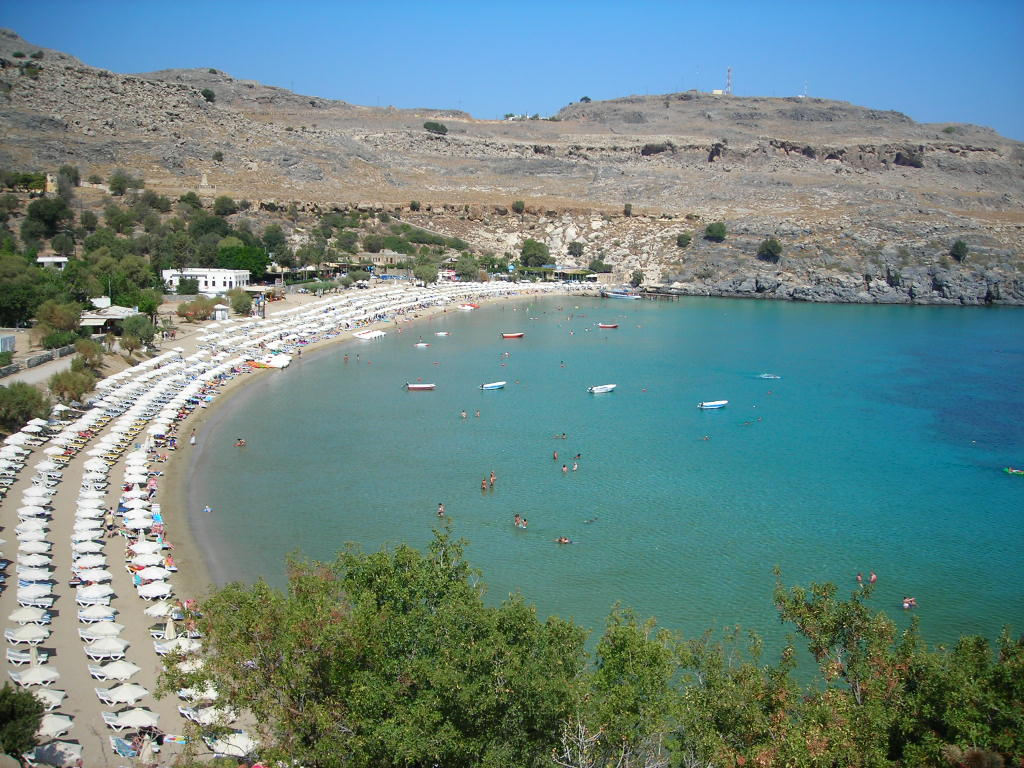
Beach of Lindos

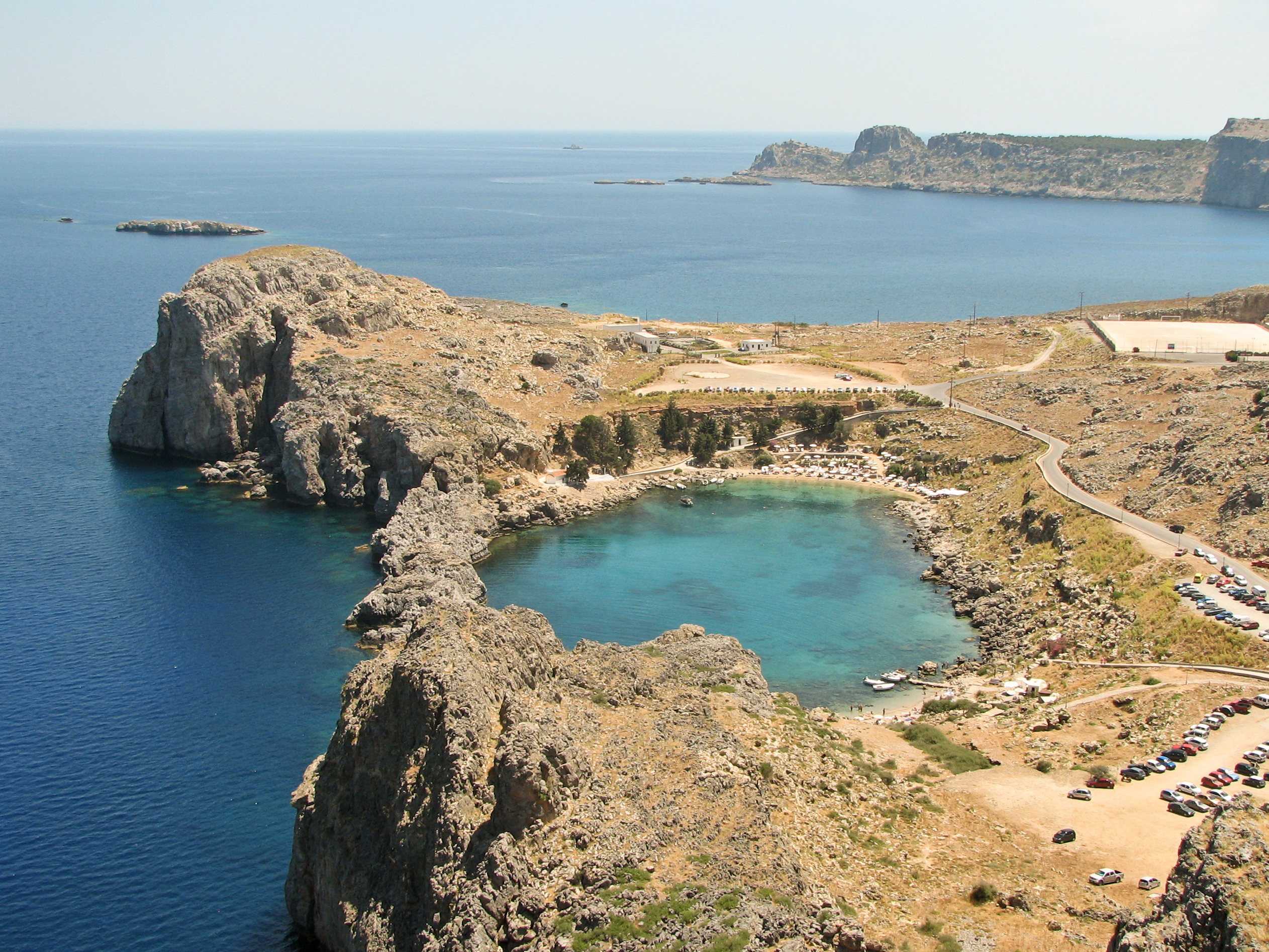
St Paul's Bay, where it is reported the apostle landed during a storm

== Notable people ==
- Chares of Lindos, sculptor, constructed the Colossus of Rhodes
- Cleobulus of Lindos
- Patriarch Joannicius II of Constantinople
- Ioannis Zigdis (1913–1997), politician and economist

== See also ==
- List of traditional Greek place names
- Chapel of Saint George Pahimahiotis
