= List of settlements in the Dodecanese =

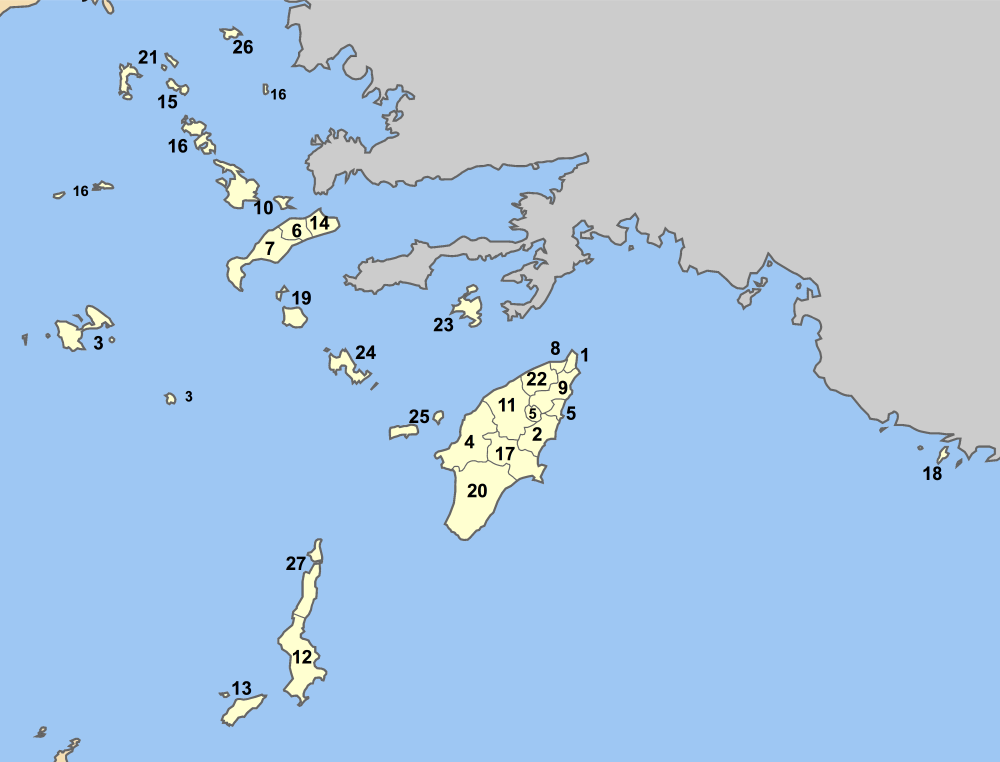
Map of municipalities in the Dodecanese

This is a list of settlements in the Dodecanese islands, Greece. It is grouped by regional unit.

== Kalymnos (regional unit) ==
- Agathonisi
- Astypalaia
- Kalymnos
- Leipsoi
- Leros
- Patmos

== Karpathos (regional unit) ==
- Aperi
- Arkasa
- Karpathos
- Kasos
- Menetes
- Mesochori
- Olympos
- Othos
- Pyles
- Stoa, Karpathos|Stoa
- Volada

== Kos (regional unit) ==
- Antimacheia
- Asfendiou
- Mastixari
- Kardamaina
- Kefalos
- Kos
- Tigaki
- Marmari
- Pyli

== Rhodes (regional unit) ==
- Afantou
- Agios Isidoros
- Apolakkia
- Apollona
- Archangelos
- Archipoli
- Arnitha
- Asklipieio, Rhodes
- Chalki
- Damatria
- Dimylia
- Emponas
- Fanes
- Gennadi
- Ialysos
- Istrios
- Kalathos, Rhodes
- Kalavarda
- Kalythies
- Kastellorizo
- Kattavia
- Koskinou
- Kremasti
- Kritinia
- Lachania
- Laerma
- Lardos
- Lindos
- Livadia, Tilos
- Malonas
- Maritsa
- Masari, Rhodes
- Megalo Chorio, Tilos
- Mesanagros
- Monolithos
- Paradeisi
- Pastida
- Platania, Rhodes
- Profilia
- Psinthos
- Pylonas
- Rhodes (city)
- Salakos
- Siana, Rhodes
- Soroni
- Symi
- Theologos
- Vati (Rhodes)

== See also ==
- List of towns and villages in Greece
