= Kameiros (municipality) =

Kameiros Κάμειρος
- Municipal unit
- Location within Rhodes

- Location within Greece
- Coordinates: 36°20′N 27°55′E
- Country: Greece
- Administrative region: South Aegean
- Regional unit: Rhodes
- Municipality: Rhodes

Area
  - Municipal unit: 211.8 km^{2} (81.8 sq mi)

Population (2021)
  - Municipal unit: 4,401
  - Municipal unit density: 20.78/km^{2} (53.82/sq mi)
- Time zone: UTC+2 (EET)
  - Summer (DST): UTC+3 (EEST)

Kameiros (Greek: Δήμος Καμείρου) is a former municipality on the island of Rhodes, in the Dodecanese, Greece. Since the 2011 local government reform it has been part of the municipality of Rhodes, of which it is a municipal unit. The municipal unit lies on the northwest coast of Rhodes, stretching inland into the north-central part of the island.

The seat of the municipality was in Soroni. Other large towns are Apóllona, Fanes, Salakos, and Kalavarda. It did not include the small port of Kameiros Skala, which was in Attavyros municipality (now municipal unit). The municipal population was 4,401 at the 2021 census, and the land area is 211.825 km^{2}.

The municipality was named after the ancient city of Kameiros, which lies just west of Kalavarda.

== See also ==
- Camirus
