= Agios Isidoros =

Agios Isidoros may refer to several places in Greece:

- Agios Isidoros, Rhodes, a village on the island of Rhodes
- Agios Isidoros, Lesbos, a village on the island of Lesbos
- Agios Isidoros, Paphos, a village in Cyprus
