= South Rhodes =

South Rhodes Νότια Ρόδος
- Municipal unit
- Location within Rhodes

- Location within Greece
- Coordinates: 36°01′N 27°55′E
- Country: Greece
- Administrative region: South Aegean
- Regional unit: Rhodes
- Municipality: Rhodes

Area
  - Municipal unit: 379.1 km^{2} (146.4 sq mi)

Population (2021)
  - Municipal unit: 3,704
  - Municipal unit density: 9.771/km^{2} (25.31/sq mi)
- Time zone: UTC+2 (EET)
  - Summer (DST): UTC+3 (EEST)
- Website: Official website

South Rhodes (Greek: Νότια Ρόδος - Nótia Ródos) is a former municipality on the island of Rhodes, in the Dodecanese, Greece. Since the 2011 local government reform it is part of the municipality Rhodes, of which it is a municipal unit.

== Geography ==
The municipal unit comprises the southernmost portion of the island, and is a result of a union of ten former communities:

| Community | Population (2021) | Area (km²) | Localities (main locality shown in italics) |
|---|---|---|---|
| Apolakkia (Απολακκιά) | 409 | 29.1 | Apolakkia |
| Arnitha (Αρνίθα) | 124 | 22.0 | Arnitha |
| Asklipieio (Ασκληπιείο) | 765 | 46.6 | Asklipieio; Kiotari |
| Gennadi (Γεννάδι) | 1,224 | 33.5 | Gennadi |
| Istrios (Ίστριος) | 160 | 18.4 | Istrios |
| Kattavia (Κατταβιά) | 323 | 97.4 | Kattavia; Agios Pavlos; Machairia; Plimmyri; Prasonisi |
| Lachania (Λαχανιά) | 139 | 25.4 | Lachania |
| Mesanagros (Μεσαναγρός) | 96 | 51.8 | Mesanagros |
| Profilia (Προφίλια) | 131 | 15.9 | Profilia |
| Vati (Βάτι) | 333 | 39.1 | Vati |

At the 2021 census, the population was 3,704. It has a land area of 379.050 km², covering about 27 percent of the island's area. The seat of the municipality was in Gennádi.

== Gallery ==
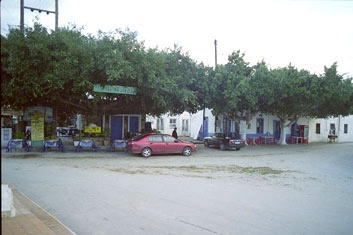
A square in Kattavia

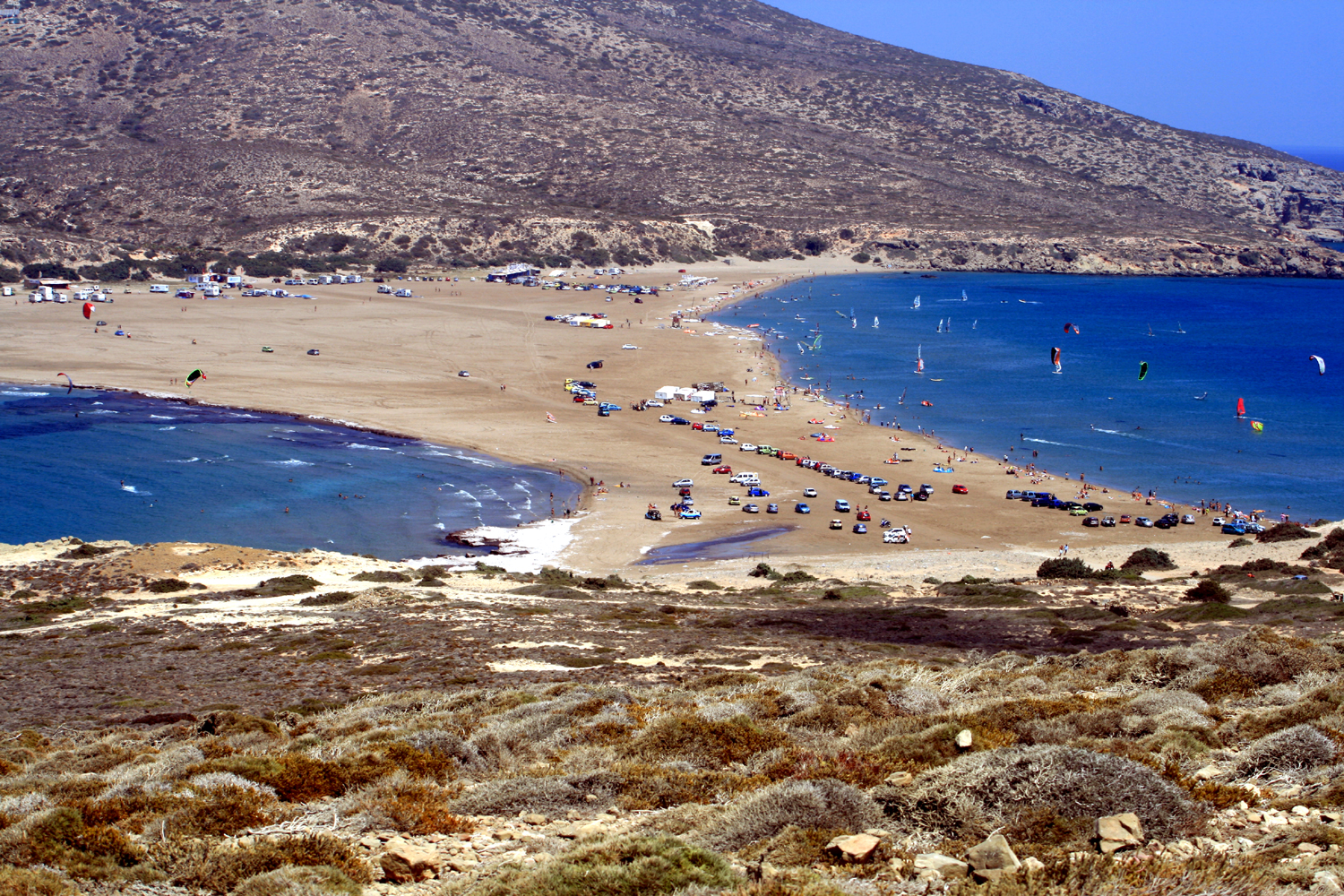
Prasonisi beach

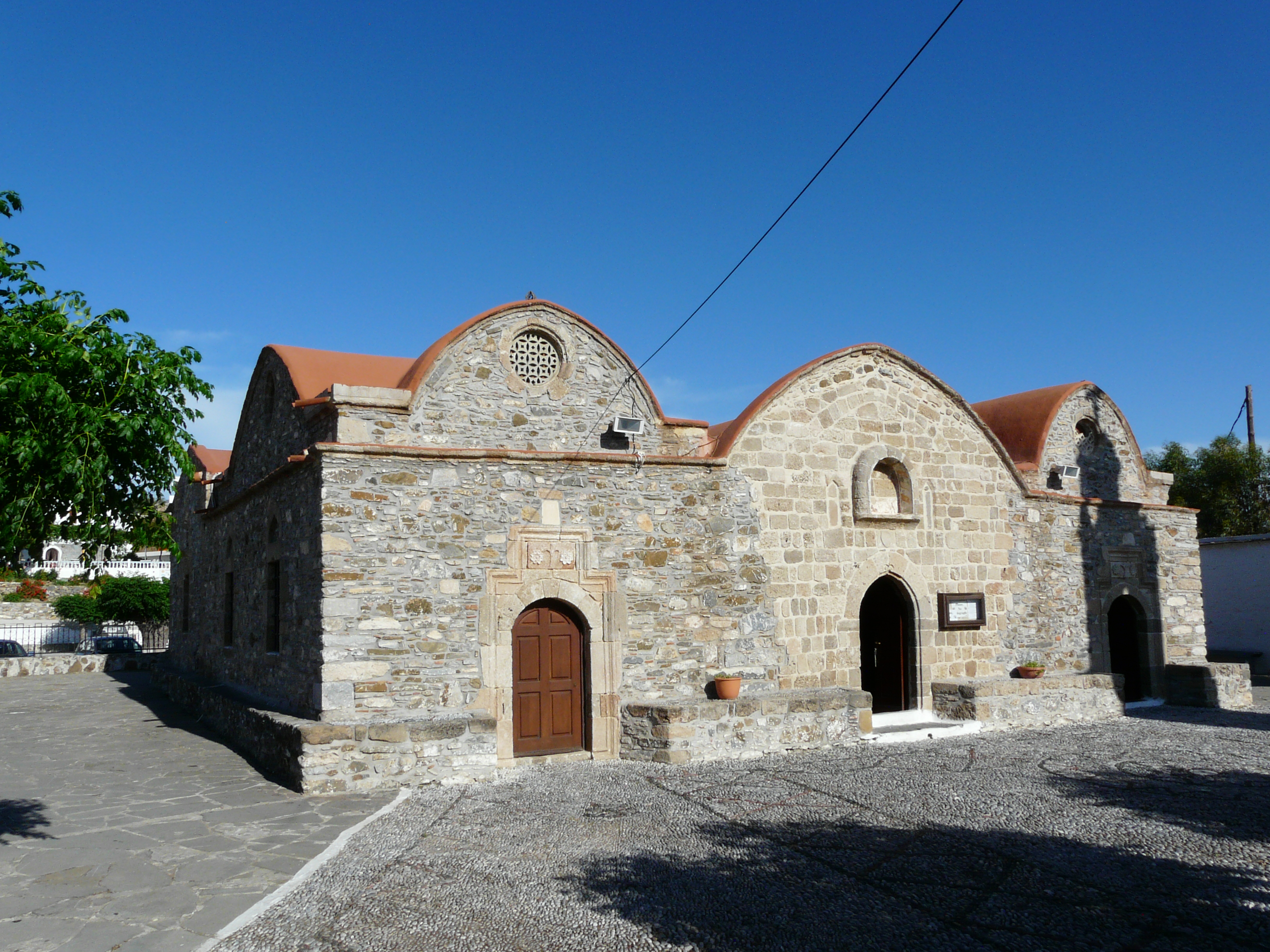
Church of the Dormition in Asklipieio

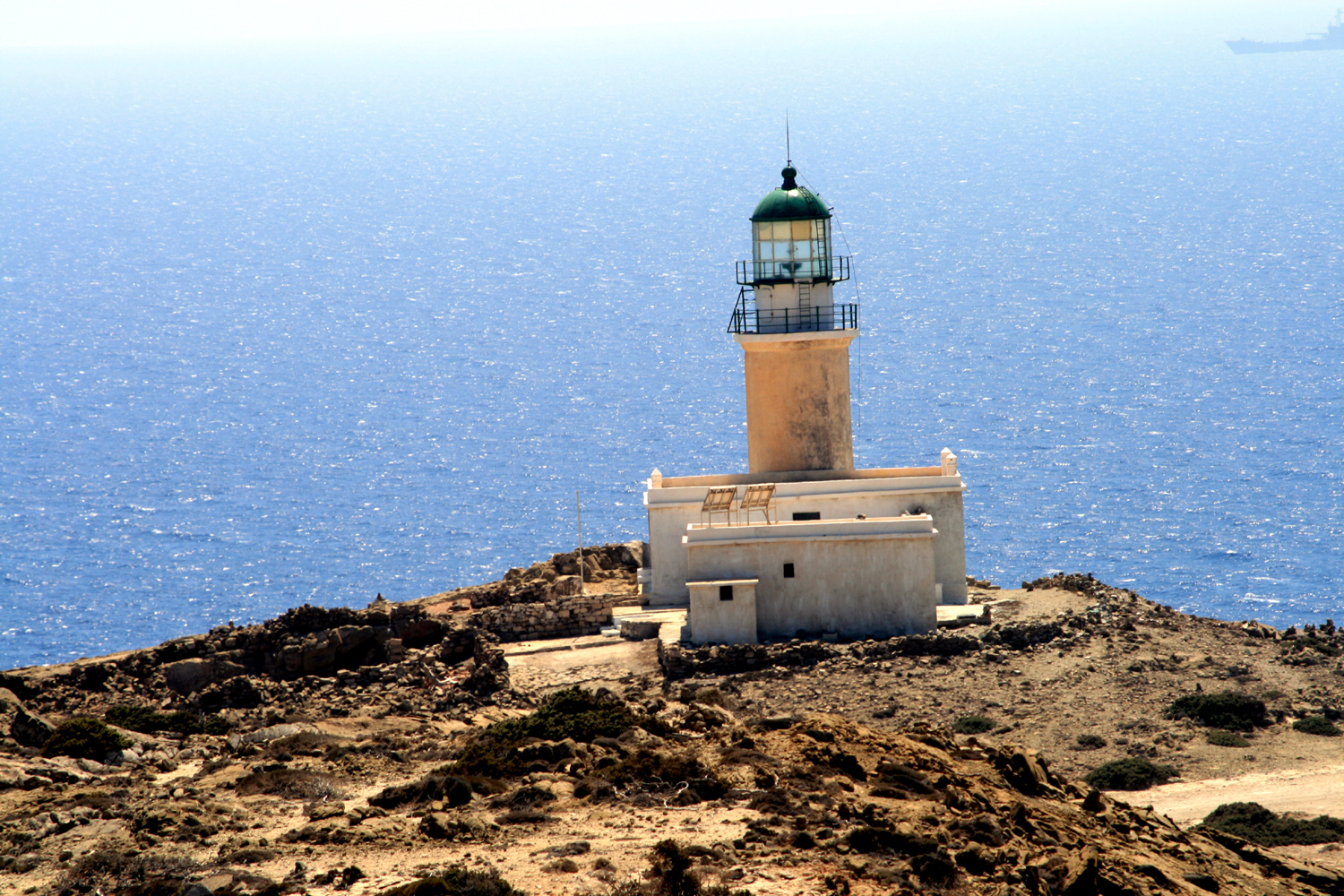
Prasonisi Lighthouse
