= Kattavia =

Kattavia Κατταβιά
- Community
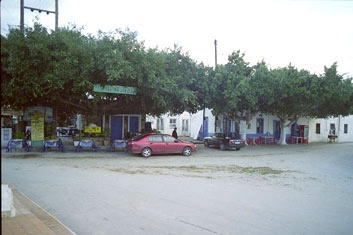
- Town square in Kattavia

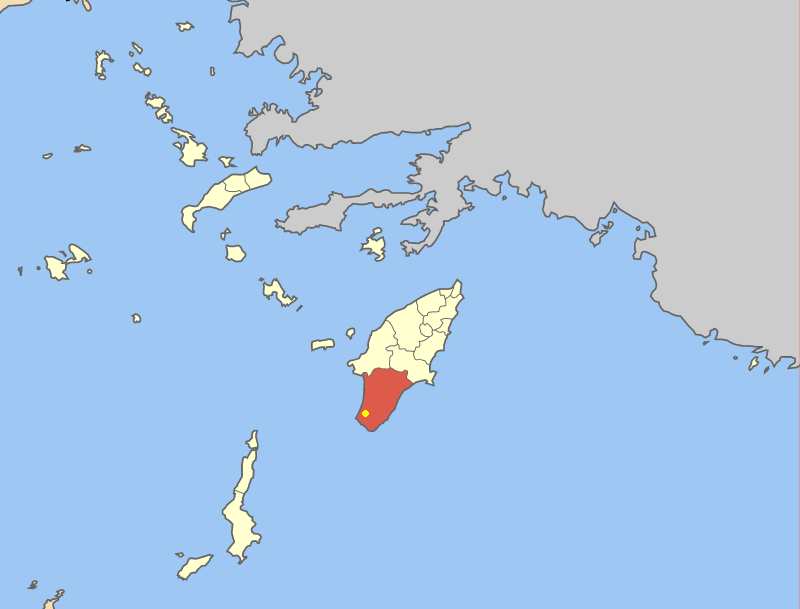
- Kattavia (yellow dot) within South Rhodes municipal unit (red)

- Location within Greece
- Coordinates: 35°57′N 27°46′E
- Country: Greece
- Administrative region: South Aegean
- Regional unit: Rhodes
- Municipality: Rhodes
- Municipal unit: South Rhodes

Population (2021)
  - Community: 323
- Time zone: UTC+2 (EET)
  - Summer (DST): UTC+3 (EEST)

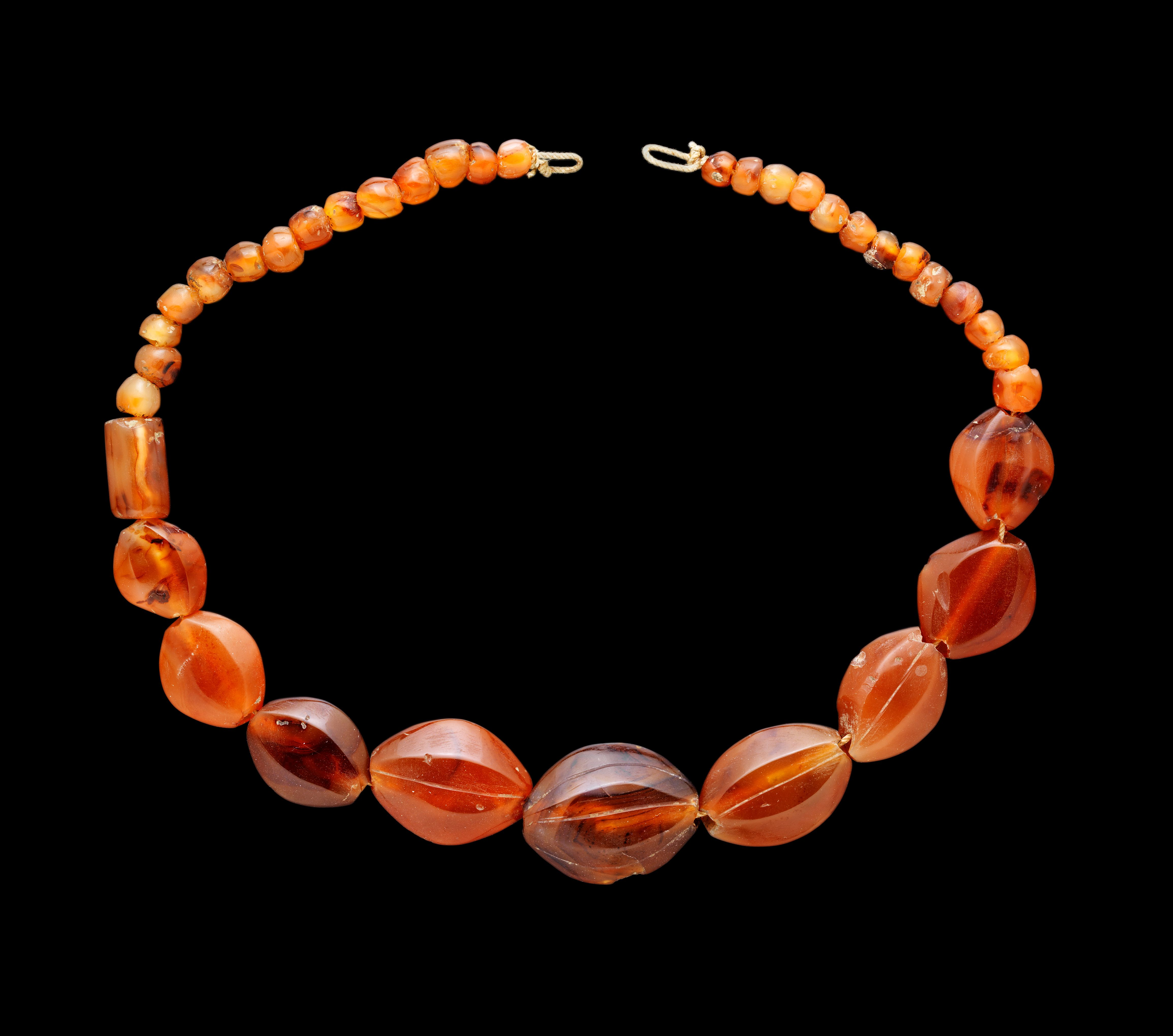
Mycenean necklace found in Kattavia

Kattavia (Greek: Κατταβιά; Italian: Cattavia) is a small village located on the southernmost tip of the island of Rhodes. It is located within the municipal unit of South Rhodes (Nótia Ródos - Νότια Ρόδος) and was at the epicentre of the 2008 Dodecanese earthquake.

== Overview ==
Kattavia is a part of the Municipality of Southern Rhodes which is one of 10 municipalities on Rhodes. The municipality seat is Gennadi, which is located about 14 km north of Kattavia.

Kattavia village square or platia is situated over a creek which is dry for most of the year. The village currently has five full-service cafes and two general stores.

Kattavia is generally considered to be a traditional village which hasn't been affected much by overdevelopment. The Municipality of Southern Rhodes requires all new construction to adhere to strict traditional building designs when located within the village limits.

In recent years, the village has become a destination due to its proximity to Prasonisi, a popular windsurfing beach.

== History ==
When the Knights Hospitaller ruled Rhodes, Kattavia was turned into a fortified village where the population could find refuge when attacked by forces of the Ottoman Empire.

=== Historical Sites ===
The church of Agia Paraskevi, the patron saint of the village (19th century), and the church of Panagia Katholiki a 10th-century church located within the villages cemetery.

On the way to Prasonisi on the right hand side, the archaeological site of “Vroulia” is found. It is an ancient coastal settlement that many to believe to the predessecor to modern day Kattavia known for its terracotta vessels called “vessels of Vroulia”. Other historical sites include:

- Saint George (17th century)
- Saint Minas (19th century)
- Prophet Elias (19th century)
- Apostle Paul (20th century)
- Saint Panteleimonas (20th century)
- Saint Mark (Italian Catholic church (20th century) reopened (August, 2017) as a Greek Orthodox Church)

== Demographics ==
Kattavia's resident population is 323 people (2021), but in the summer months the population of Kattavia swells to over 700, due to the Greek Diaspora returning home from countries such as the United States and Australia.

== Festivals ==
The village's patron saint is Aghia Paraskevi. Her feast day is July 26, when the village throws a 3-day festival held within the village square. Festivals throughout the year include:

- Saint Paraskevi on July 26. The festival takes place the night before and ends the next evening.
- Saint Panteleimonas on July 27. The festival takes place the night before and ends the next evening
- Dormition of the Virgin Mary on August 15.
