= Attavyros (municipality) =

Attavyros Αττάβυρος
- Municipal unit
- Location within Rhodes

- Location within Greece
- Coordinates: 36°14′N 27°51′E
- Country: Greece
- Administrative region: South Aegean
- Regional unit: Rhodes
- Municipality: Rhodes

Area
  - Municipal unit: 234.4 km^{2} (90.5 sq mi)

Population (2021)
  - Municipal unit: 2,127
  - Municipal unit density: 9.074/km^{2} (23.50/sq mi)
- Time zone: UTC+2 (EET)
  - Summer (DST): UTC+3 (EEST)

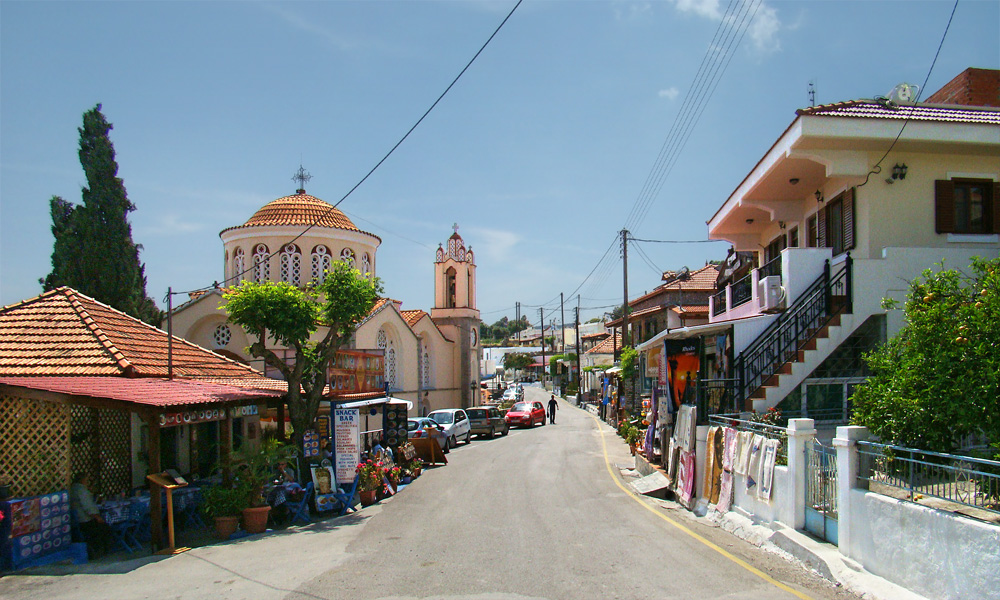
View of Siana

Attavyros (Greek: Αττάβυρος) is a former municipality on the island of Rhodes, in the Dodecanese, Greece. Since the 2011 local government reform it is part of the municipality Rhodes, of which it is a municipal unit.

== Geography ==
The population is 2,127 (2021 census); the land area is 234.350 km². It is the westernmost municipal unit on the island, occupying the central portion of its western coast. The seat of the municipality was in Emponas. Its largest other towns are Ágios Isídoros and Kritinia. In land area it is the second-largest municipal unit on Rhodes and the second-least densely populated, after South Rhodes (Notia Rodos).

The municipal unit is composed by five communities:

Community	Population (2011)	Localities (main locality shown in italics)
Agios Isidoros (Άγιος Ισίδωρος)	355	Agios Isidoros (355 inh.)
Emponas (Έμπωνας)	1,242	Emponas (1,061 inh.); Mandriko (Μανδρικό, 181 inh.)
Kritinia (Κρητηνία)	503	Kritinia (454 inh.); Kameiros Skala (Κάμειρος Σκάλα, 49 inh.)
Monolithos (Μονόλιθος)	181	Monolithos (181 inh.)
Siana (Σιάνα)	152	Siana (151 inh.); Lakki (Λακκί, 1 inh.)

== Gallery ==
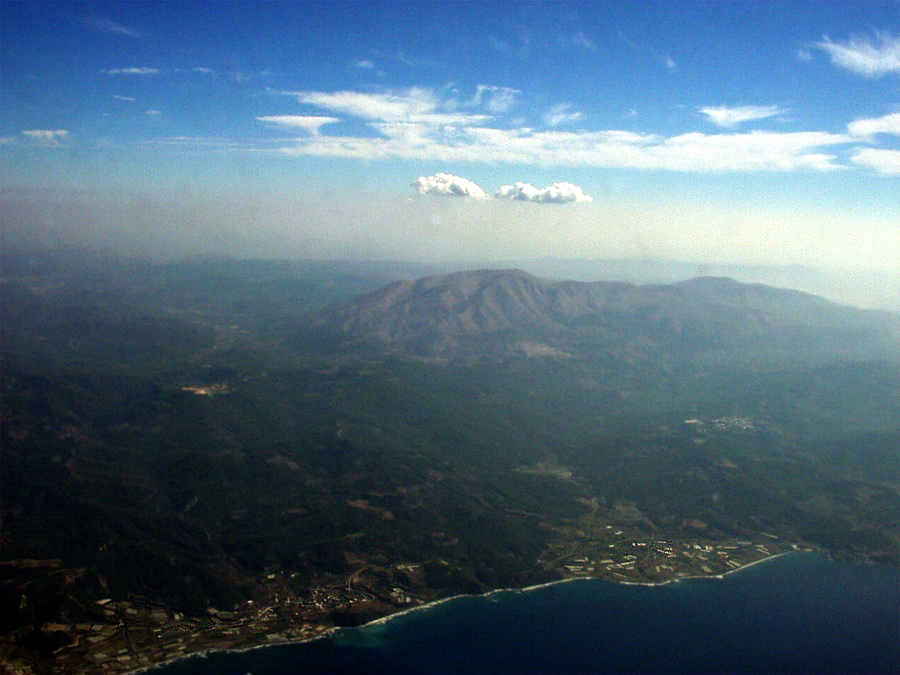
Aerial view of Attavyros mountain and municipal unit

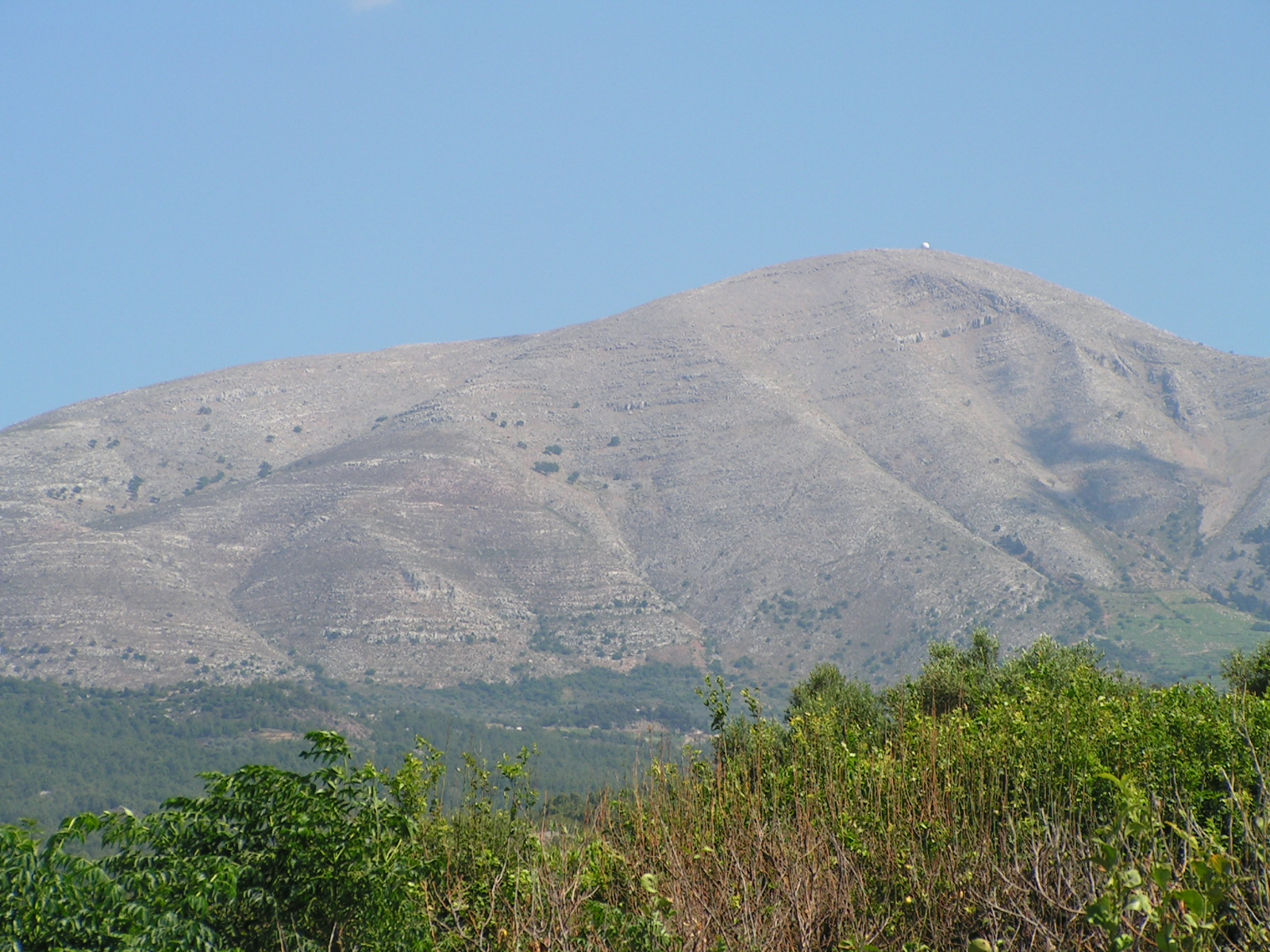
Attavyros mountain

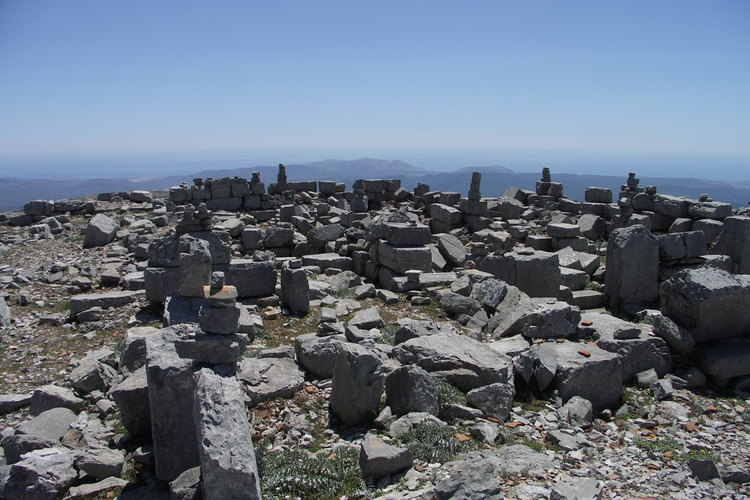
Temple of Zeus at the top of Attavyros Mountain
