= Monolithos, Greece =

Monolithos Μονόλιθος
- Community
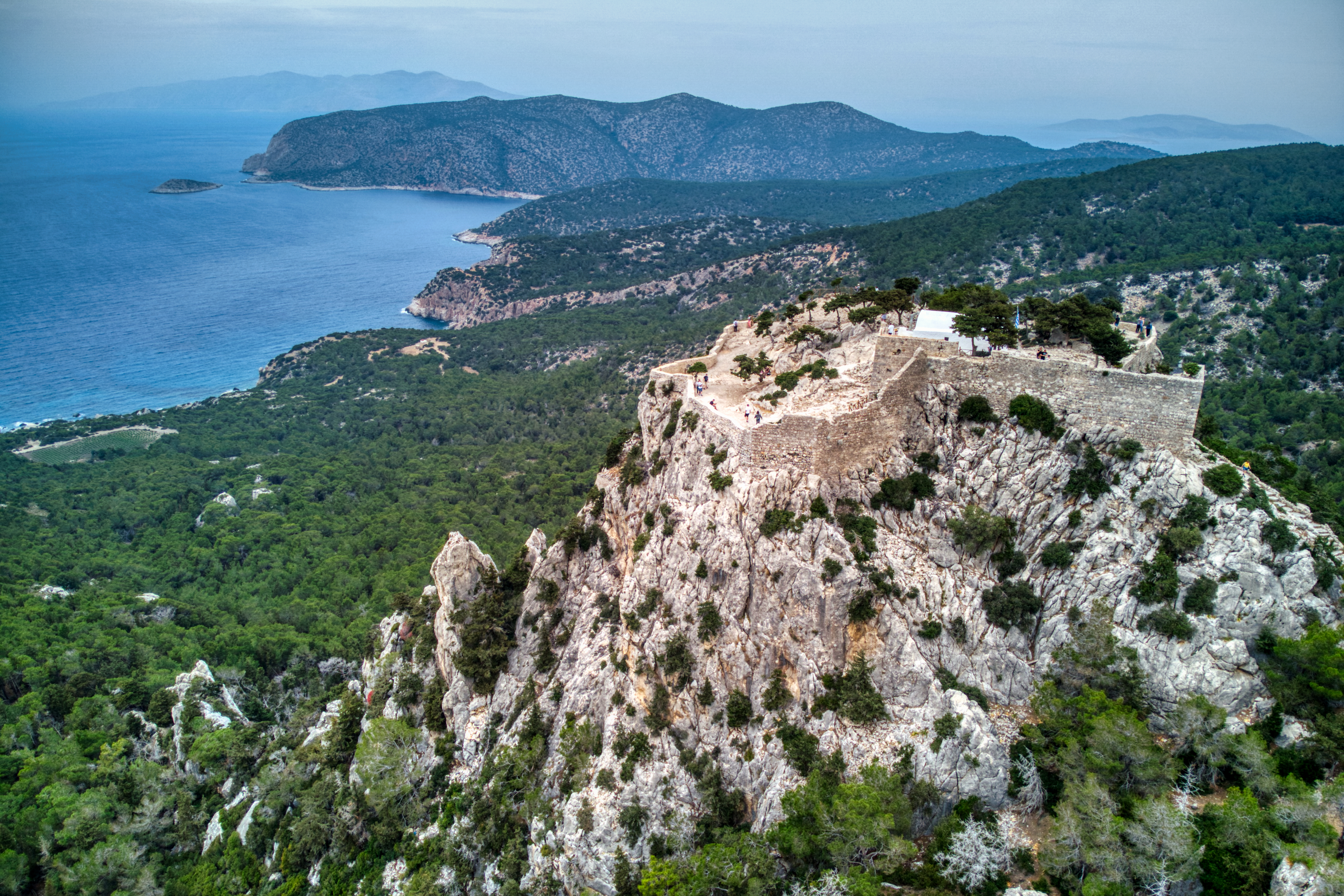
- The castle of Monolithos

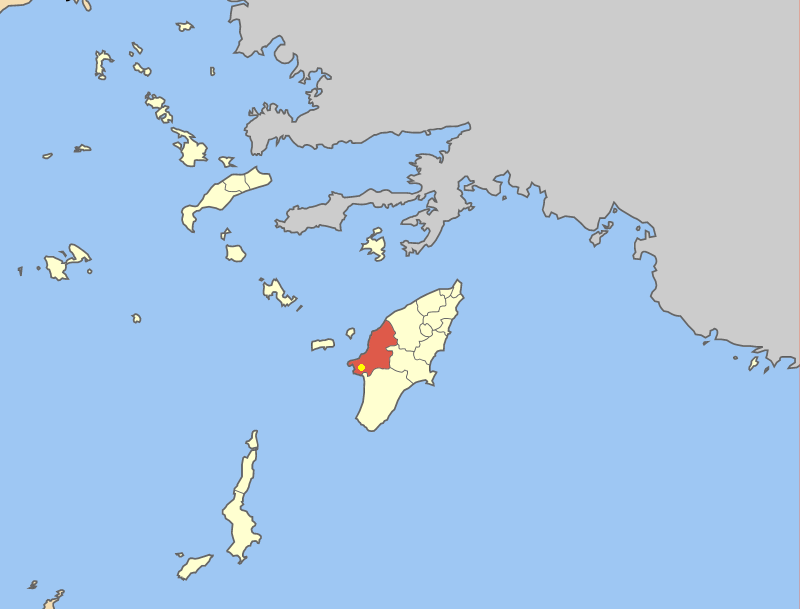
- Monolithos (yellow dot) within Attavyros municipal unit (red)

- Location within Greece
- Coordinates: 36°7.9′N 27°44.4′E
- Country: Greece
- Administrative region: South Aegean
- Regional unit: Rhodes
- Municipality: Rhodes
- Municipal unit: Attavyros

Population (2021)
  - Community: 169
- Time zone: UTC+2 (EET)
  - Summer (DST): UTC+3 (EEST)

Monolithos (Greek: Μονόλιθος) is a Greek village on the island of Rhodes, South Aegean region, belonging to the municipal unit of Attavyros. It is located 8 km south-east of Apolakkia and 28 km from Prasonisi.

== Overview ==
The name of the village means "single stone" or "one stone." It typically refers to a large, single, solid block of stone or rock, often used in reference to natural formations or structures. The name refers to the Monolithos Castle, which is built on a large, solitary 100m high rock formation. These are the ruins of the castle of the Knights Hospitaller built in 1476, outside the village. This castle was built to protect the island from attacks. In fact, this castle was never conquered. The Castle of Monolithos is widely ruined today but it offers great views of the sea and the two islets opposite to it. Inside the Castle, there is a small working chapel dedicated to Agios Panteleimon (Saint Pantaleon). Access to the castle is by a staircase cut into the rock. The steps, whilst not particularly steep, are quite slippery simply due to the numbers of visitors wearing them away.
