= Kritinia =

Kritinia Κρητηνία
- Community
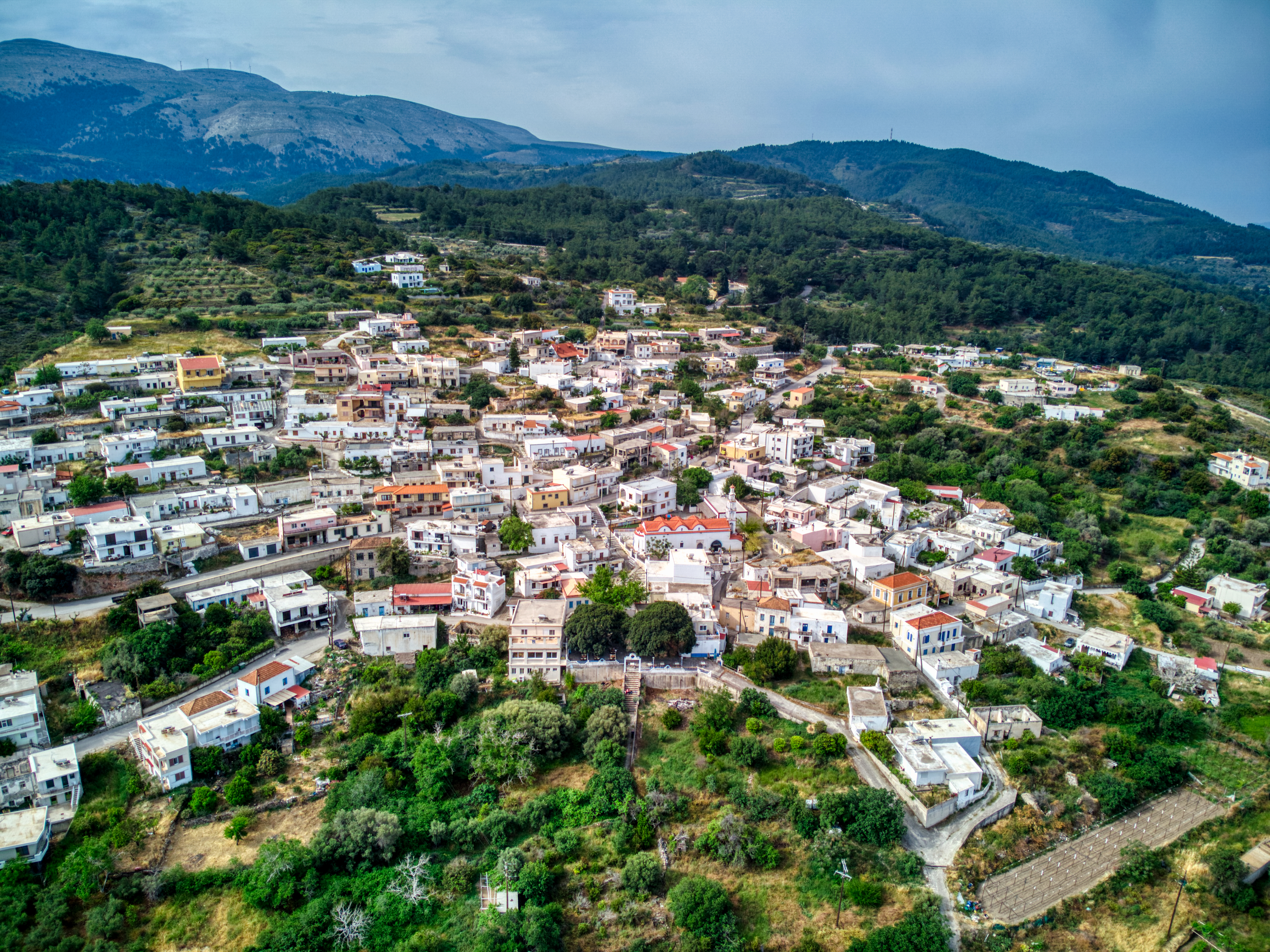
- Kritinia

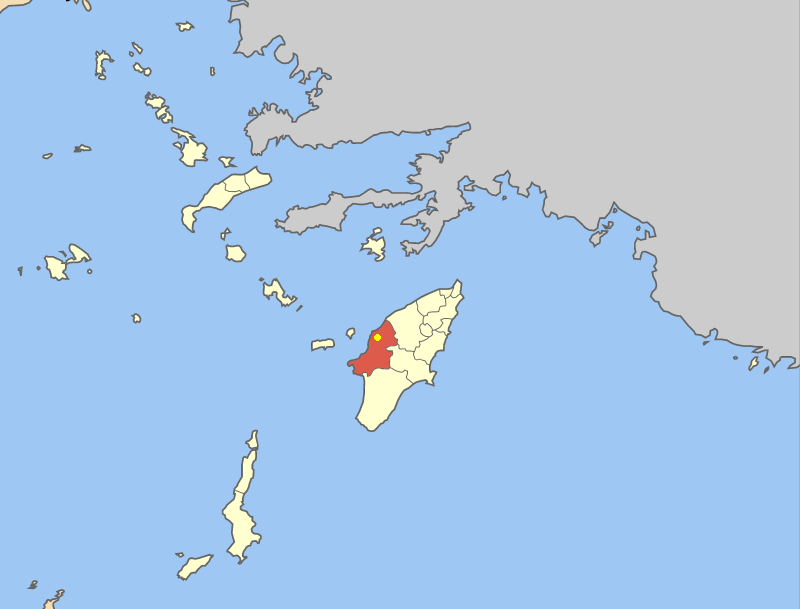
- Kritinia (yellow dot) within Attavyros municipal unit (red)

- Location within Greece
- Coordinates: 36°15′N 27°49.9′E
- Country: Greece
- Administrative region: South Aegean
- Regional unit: Rhodes
- Municipality: Rhodes
- Municipal unit: Attavyros
- Elevation: 242 m (794 ft)

Population (2021)
  - Community: 388
- Time zone: UTC+2 (EET)
  - Summer (DST): UTC+3 (EEST)
- Website: Official website

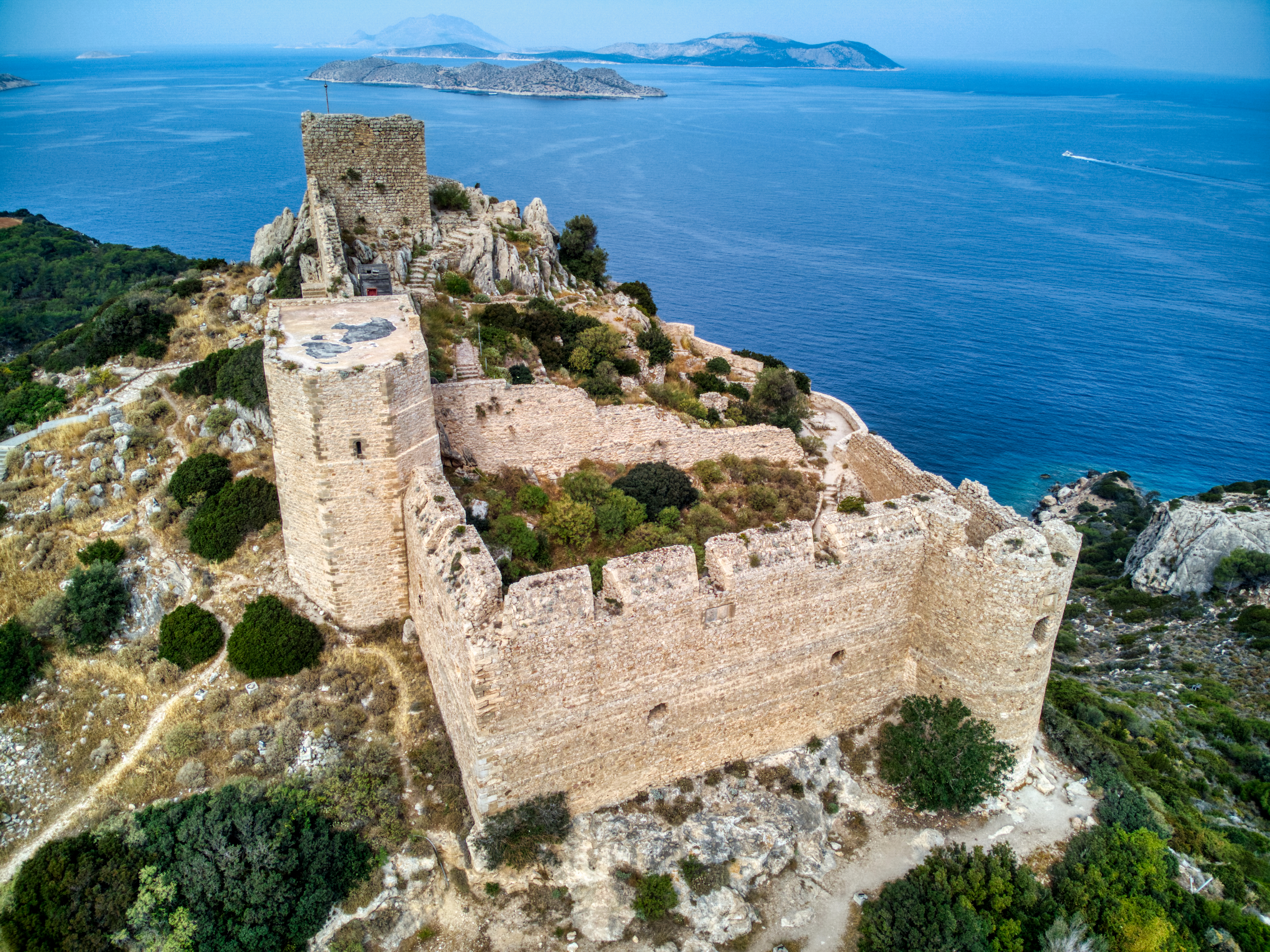
The ruins of Kastellos castle

Kritinia (Greek: Κρητηνία) is a Greek village and community in the municipal unit of Attavyros, on the island of Rhodes, South Aegean region. In 2021 the population was 388 for the community, which includes the locality of Kameiros Skala.

== History ==
The village, meaning New Crete, was founded by some families escaped from Crete (Κρήτη) during the Turkish rule in the island. Originally, the settlement was located by the coast, in the current position of Kameiros Skala; but after the Byzantine era it was moved on the hills, for safety against pirates. In 1658, the Venetian Doge Francesco Morosini tried to conquer Rhodes entering at Kameiros Skala beach, but the Venetian army was rejected.

The castle above Kritinia, named Kastellos (Κάστελλος), was built in 1472 by Giorgio Orsini to protect the inhabitants of the village from the attacks of the Ottoman fleets. Until the liberation of the Dodecanese, the village was named Kastelli, from the Latin Castellum, meaning castle.

== Geography ==
Kritinia is located on a hillside between Mount Attavyros and the western coast of the island of Rhodes. It is 10 km from Embonas, 51 km from the town of Rhodes, 53 km from Lindos and 35 km from Rhodes International Airport.

The locality of Kameiros Skala (Greek: Κάμειρος Σκάλα) is located by the Aegean Sea, 5 km from Kritinia (36.27229°N 27.82863°E). It has a beach and a little port with a ferry service to the island of Halki. Despite the name Kameiros Skala is some 14 km from Kameiros. Close to it is Mandriko, a locality which is part of the community of Embonas.

== Gallery ==
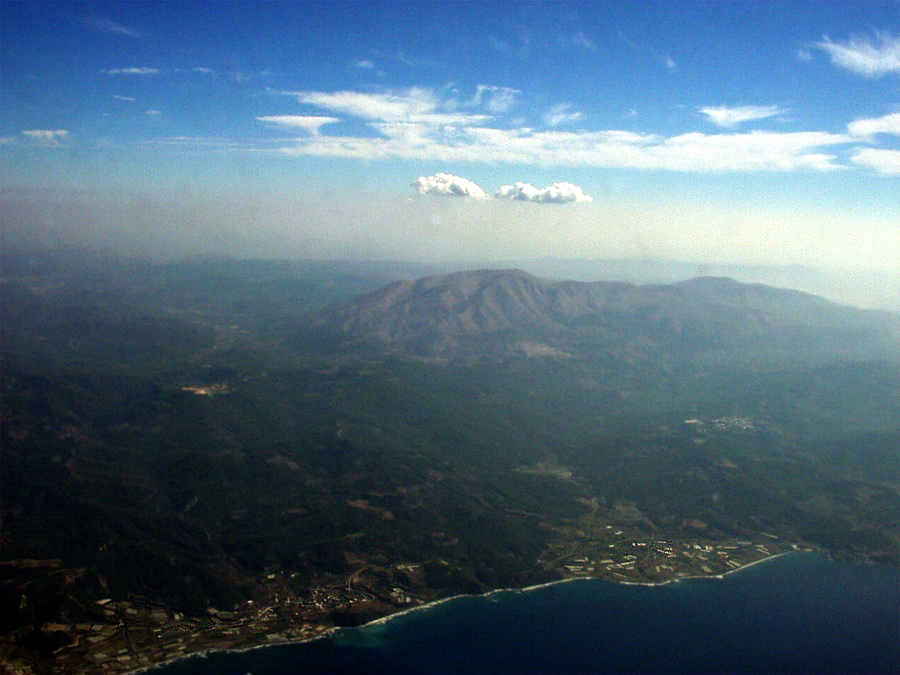
Aerial view of Attavyros area. The coastal settlements are Mandriko (left) and Kameiros Skala (right). On the hill upon K. Skala is visible Kritinia

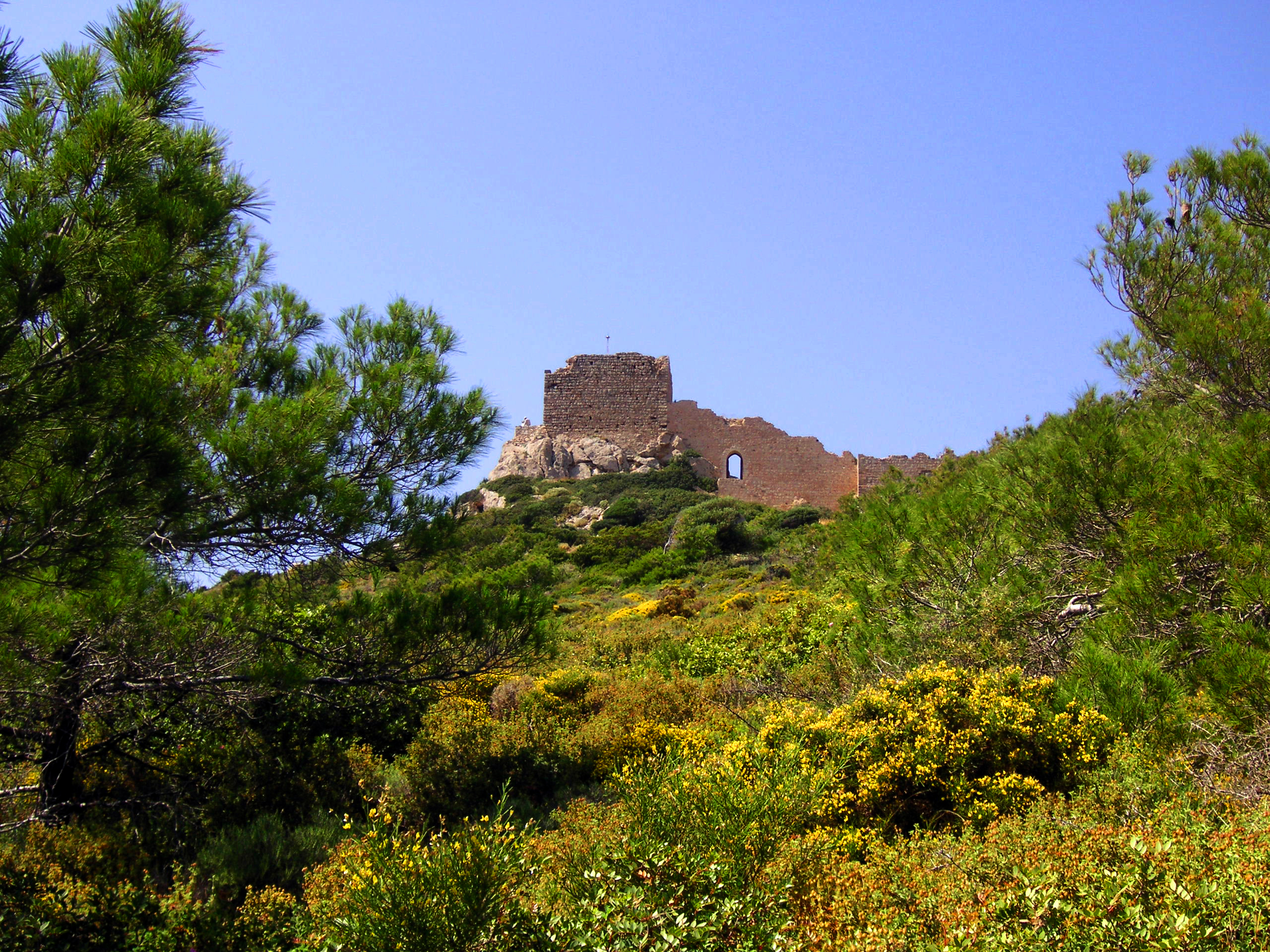
Kastelos castle and the hill of Kritinia.
