= 2008 Dodecanese earthquake =

- Location within Greece
- UTC time: 2008-07-15 03:26:35
- ISC event: 13389231
- USGS-ANSS: ComCat
- Local date: 15 July 2008
- Local time: 06:26:35 EEST
- Magnitude: 6.4 M_{w}
- Depth: 52 km (32 mi)
- Epicenter: 35.93°N 27.81°E
- Areas affected: Greece
- Max. intensity: MMI VII (Very strong)
- Casualties: 1 dead

The 2008 Dodecanese earthquake occurred near Kattavia on the island of Rhodes in the eastern Mediterranean Sea on 15 July. The quake struck at 06:26 a.m. local time (UTC+3) and one woman was killed when she slipped and fell as she tried to flee her home. However, the earthquake did not cause any major damage. The earthquake was felt across the entire eastern Mediterranean, as far west as Libya, and inland as far as Damascus.

There was a significant aftershock the next day, 16 July, at 02:52 a.m. local time, which resulted in additional injuries. The aftershock was rated 4.8 M_{w}.

== See also ==
- List of earthquakes in 2008
- List of earthquakes in Greece
