= Gennadi =

Gennadi Γεννάδι
- Community
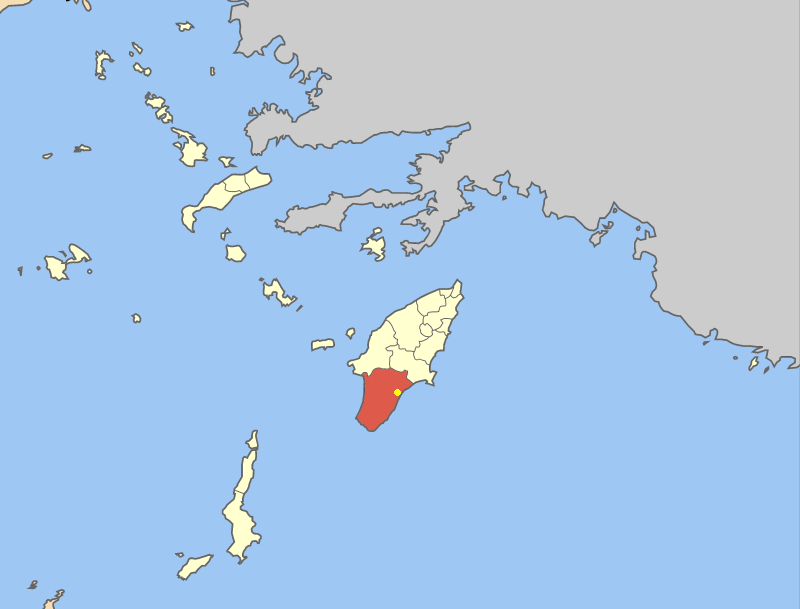
- Gennadi (yellow dot) within South Rhodes municipal unit (red)

- Location within Greece
- Coordinates: 36°1.4′N 27°54.5′E
- Country: Greece
- Administrative region: South Aegean
- Regional unit: Rhodes
- Municipality: Rhodes
- Municipal unit: South Rhodes

Population (2021)
  - Community: 1,224
- Time zone: UTC+2 (EET)
  - Summer (DST): UTC+3 (EEST)

Gennadi (Γεννάδι) is a village on the southeastern coast of the island of Rhodes, in the Dodecanese within the South Aegean region of Greece. It was the seat of the former municipal unit of South Rhodes until the 2011 Kallikratis reform. As of the 2021 census, it had a permanent population of 1,224.

The village lies about 64 km from the city of Rhodes, 27 km from Lindos, and roughly 65 km from Rhodes International Airport.

== Population ==
The population trend over recent censuses is shown below:

Year	Permanent population
1991	482
2001	594
2011	671
2021	1,224

== History ==
Gennadi served as the administrative centre (seat) of the former municipality of South Rhodes until its absorption into the larger municipality of Rhodes under the 2011 Kallikratis reform.

During the 2023 Greece wildfires, Gennadi and the rest of South Rhodes were particularly affected. Damage to agricultural land and the destruction of a restaurant were preceded by a substantial evacuation of tourists staying in nearby coastal resorts. The fires caused substantial disruption to livelihoods linked to tourism and agriculture across the island.

== Religious buildings and local traditions ==
One of Gennadi's historic buildings is the basilica of Agia Anastasia the Roman, which the Municipality of Rhodes dates to the 14th century. The municipal tourist guide describes frescoes depicting the saint's martyrdom and the Last Judgement, as well as ancient marble reused from an earlier church. The building now serves as the village cemetery church.

Outside the village, the chapel of Agios Georgios Skolonitis is dated to the 18th century. Residents of Gennadi and surrounding settlements gather there on 1 May to celebrate Labour Day and the arrival of spring.

== Transport ==
Gennadi is linked to Rhodes and other settlements by intercity buses operated by KTEL Rodou.

== Economy and tourism ==
The local economy combines traditional agriculture, such as olive cultivation, with a modest but growing tourism sector along its coastal area. Its long beach has developed small hotels, guesthouses, and tavernas catering to visitors.

== See also ==
- Kiotari
- South Rhodes
