= Apolakkia =

Apolakkia Απολακκιά
- Community
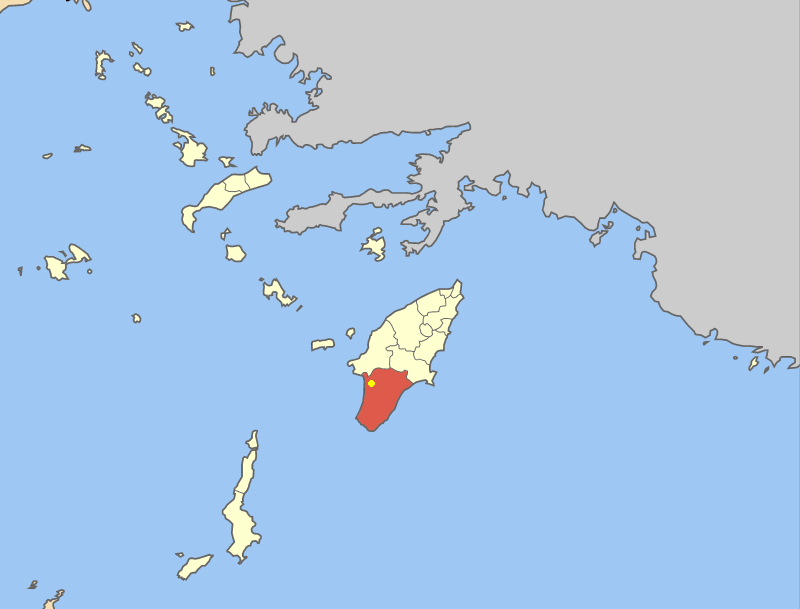
- Apolakkia (yellow dot) within South Rhodes municipal unit (red)

- Location within Greece
- Coordinates: 36°4′N 27°47.3′E
- Country: Greece
- Administrative region: South Aegean
- Regional unit: Rhodes
- Municipality: Rhodes
- Municipal unit: South Rhodes

Area
  - Community: 29.1 km^{2} (11.2 sq mi)

Population (2021)
  - Community: 409
  - Density: 14.1/km^{2} (36.4/sq mi)
- Time zone: UTC+2 (EET)
  - Summer (DST): UTC+3 (EEST)

Apolakkia (Greek: Απολακκιά) is a village in the municipal unit of South Rhodes, on the island of Rhodes, in the South Aegean region of Greece. In 2021 its population was 409.

== Geography ==
The village is located in a valley between two hills, near the Aegean Coast, 78 km from the town of Rhodes and 37 from Lindos. Nearest villages are Arnitha (3,5 km), Istrios and Monolithos.

== Main sights ==
Apolakkia Beach, also known as Limni, is a receptive place for summer tourism. The beach, on the west side of Rhodes Coast, is 3,500 m long and 35m wide.

Near Apolakkia are located the ancient ruins of the churches of Agia Irini and Agios Giorgios. Some km in north of the settlement is located the Apolakkia Lake.
