= Othos =

Othos Όθος
- Community
- Location within Greece
- Coordinates: 35°32′N 27°09′E
- Country: Greece
- Administrative region: South Aegean
- Regional unit: Karpathos-Kasos
- Municipality: Karpathos
- Municipal unit: Karpathos

Population (2021)
  - Community: 264
- Time zone: UTC+2 (EET)
  - Summer (DST): UTC+3 (EEST)

Othos is one of the ten towns on the island of Karpathos, Greece.

== Geography ==
At an elevation of 508 metres (1,667 ft), Othos is the highest town in Karpathos. It is 12 km (7.5 mi) outside of Pigadia. It is built on the southern slopes of Mount Meloura, which is in the southern part of Lastos, at an altitude of 514 metres (1,686 ft).

Othos is the most mountainous village of the island and one of the most mountainous in the prefecture of Dodecanese, its houses are built with traditional architecture and overlook the east coast of Karpathos and the Aegean.

The community of Othos includes Othos Village and the nearby settlements of Stes and Kallenes. In 2021, the community of Othos recorded a census population of 264 residents.

Othos Village is frequented daily by bus from Pigadia. It has one restaurant, one mini-market, and a small folklore museum.
