= Soroni =

Soroni Σορωνή
- Community
- Overview of Kalavarda

- Location within Greece
- Coordinates: 36°21′46″N 28°00′06″E
- Country: Greece
- Administrative region: South Aegean
- Regional unit: Rhodes
- Municipality: Rhodes
- Municipal unit: Kameiros

Population (2021)
  - Community: 1,265
- Time zone: UTC+2 (EET)
  - Summer (DST): UTC+3 (EEST)

== Background ==
Soroni (Greek: Σορωνή) is a small village on the island of Rhodes, Greece, on the northwest coast of the island. It was the seat of the former municipality of Kameiros (Κάμειρος). Its population was 1,265 at the 2021 census. The island's main power plant is located just outside the village. There are 5 very active organizations:

- The Cultural and Folklore Association of Soroni Rhodes “Ampernalli” (ampernos= the oak tree),
- The Athletic Association of Soroni Rhodes "Efklis"
- The Athletic Association of Soroni Rhodes "Ages Kameiros 2009"
- The Environment Association of Soroni Rhodes
- The Association of Women.

The most popular religious festival on the island is held at the chapel 'Agios Sylas' outside the village on the chapel's saint's day, every year from 20 to 30 July. The village is situated 24 km from the city of Rhodes.

== Arts and Culture ==
Every year, the town of Soroni celebrates the name day of St. Silas, joined by people from all over the island of Rhodes. This festival takes place at the Agios Soulas (Άγιος Σουλάς) chapel, just outside the village of Soroni. St. Silas was a close companion of St. Paul the Apostle, following him through his travels as a prophet and missionary. In accordance with the traditions of Eastern Orthodoxy, the feast of St. Silas is held on the 30th of July.

In 2025, the festival of St. Silas saw an upgrade, with a longer celebration and more activity offerings. The event lasted 10 days from the 20th to the 30th of July, the final day being the feast of St. Silas. The Festival is held by the Municipal Community of Soroni, Management Committee of Agios Soulas park, along with DERMAE and the Directorate of Culture of the Municipality of Rhodes.

Festival Offerings

- Children's activities
- Bicycle race
- Theatre performances
- Traditional greek music and dances
- Egg races
- Bag races
- Horse and donkey shows
- Traditional hut competition

== Beaches ==
Soroni beach is a popular destination for windsurfing. It is a pebble beach that has a strong breeze. It is located close to 25 kilometers from the town. It is relatively quiet and not one of the main tourist attractions on Rhodes.
