= Kalavarda =

Kalavarda Καλαβάρδα
- Community
- Location within Greece
- Coordinates: 36°20′24″N 27°56′58″E
- Country: Greece
- Administrative region: South Aegean
- Regional unit: Rhodes
- Municipality: Rhodes
- Municipal unit: Kameiros

Population (2021)
  - Community: 514
- Time zone: UTC+2 (EET)
  - Summer (DST): UTC+3 (EEST)
- Website: www.kalavarda.com

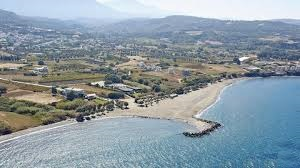
Kalavarda skyline

Kalavarda (Greek: Καλαβάρδα) is a small town in the island of Rhodes, Greece with a population of 514 (2021). It is about 28 kilometers from the island's capital, Rhodes, and about 52 kilometers from the city Lindos.
