= Fanes =

Fanes Φάνες
- Community
- Location within Greece
- Coordinates: 36°21′N 27°59′E
- Country: Greece
- Administrative region: South Aegean
- Regional unit: Rhodes
- Municipality: Rhodes
- Municipal unit: Kameiros

Population (2021)
  - Community: 859
- Time zone: UTC+2 (EET)
  - Summer (DST): UTC+3 (EEST)

Fanes (Greek: Φάνες) is a village in the northeast part of Rhodes. The main village is situated around 1 km inland, at an average elevation of 46 meters above the sea level.
