= Agios Isidoros, Lesbos =

Village in Lesbos, Greece

Coordinates: 38°28′N 26°02′E

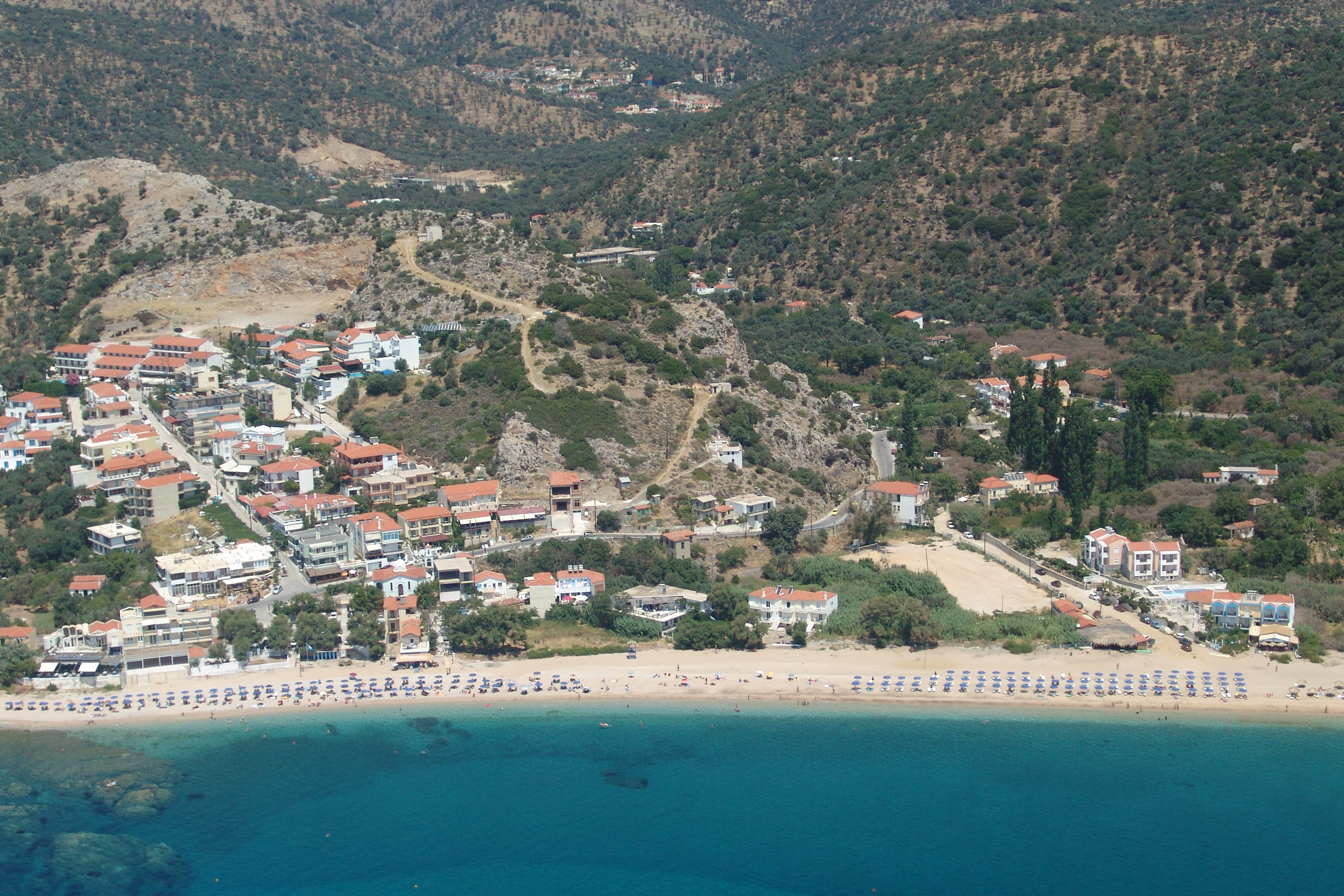
Aerial view of Agios Isidoros beach in summer 2004

Agios Isidoros (Greek: Άγιος Ισίδωρος) is a village in the municipal unit of Plomari, Lesbos Island, Greece. It is located just 2 km (1.2 mi) outside the town of Plomari, South Lesbos. It has a pebbled beach which is one of the longest in Lesbos and voted as the 7th best beach in Greece due to the safety provided, the clean water and care for the environment.

== Beach ==
Aghios Isidoros Beach lies to the southwest of Plomari and is named after a small chapel in the area. Both the coastal zone and seabed are largely pebbles with rocky outcrops in places, and the central section is organised with visitor amenities (such as umbrellas, recliner chairs, showers, bins), a volleyball court and seasonal lifeguard service.

Agios Isidoros is described as one of the longer beaches near Plomari, with a mix of sand and fine pebbles.

== Economy ==
The settlement described as combining intensive summer tourist activity with farming inland.

== Awards ==
Agios Isidoros is listed among the beaches in the Lesvos regional unit awarded the Blue Flag eco-label in the Blue Flag Greece listings.
