= Mesanagros =

Mesanagros Μεσαναγρός
- Community
- Location within Greece
- Coordinates: 36°00′N 27°49′E
- Country: Greece
- Administrative region: South Aegean
- Regional unit: Rhodes
- Municipality: Rhodes
- Municipal unit: South Rhodes

Population (2021)
  - Community: 96
- Time zone: UTC+2 (EET)
  - Summer (DST): UTC+3 (EEST)

Mesanagros (Greek: Μεσαναγρός) is a village in the south of Rhodes, Greece. It belongs to the municipal unit of South Rhodes, and is located at a distance 83 km from Rhodes.

The name Mesanagros means 'cultivated, fenced large Byzantine farm'. The village's history goes back centuries, as has been shown by evidence from by historians and travelers. It has many old monasteries.

Mesanagros is hidden among the mountains at the south tip of Rhodes. Small houses, examples of popular rural architecture, represent the tradition of the place. Square Mesanagros the church of the Assumption, built in the 13th century at the location where previously there was a large three-nave Christian basilica of the 6th century.

Nearby is the Skala of St. Thomas, a landscape with waterfalls and lush coniferous forest fauna and flora. Near Mesanagros is the Holy Monastery of Panagia Skiadeni, which owes its name to the shades (i.e. shady, summer landscape).
