= Agios Isidoros, Rhodes =

Agios Isidoros Άγιος Ισίδωρος
- Community
- Location within Greece
- Coordinates: 36°09′57″N 27°50′58″E
- Country: Greece
- Administrative region: South Aegean
- Regional unit: Rhodes
- Municipality: Rhodes
- Municipal unit: Attavyros

Population (2021)
  - Community: 277
- Time zone: UTC+2 (EET)
  - Summer (DST): UTC+3 (EEST)

Agios Isidoros is a small town, locally referred to as "the Village" on the island of Rhodes. It is known for wine production.
