= Embonas =

Embonas Έμπωνας
- Community
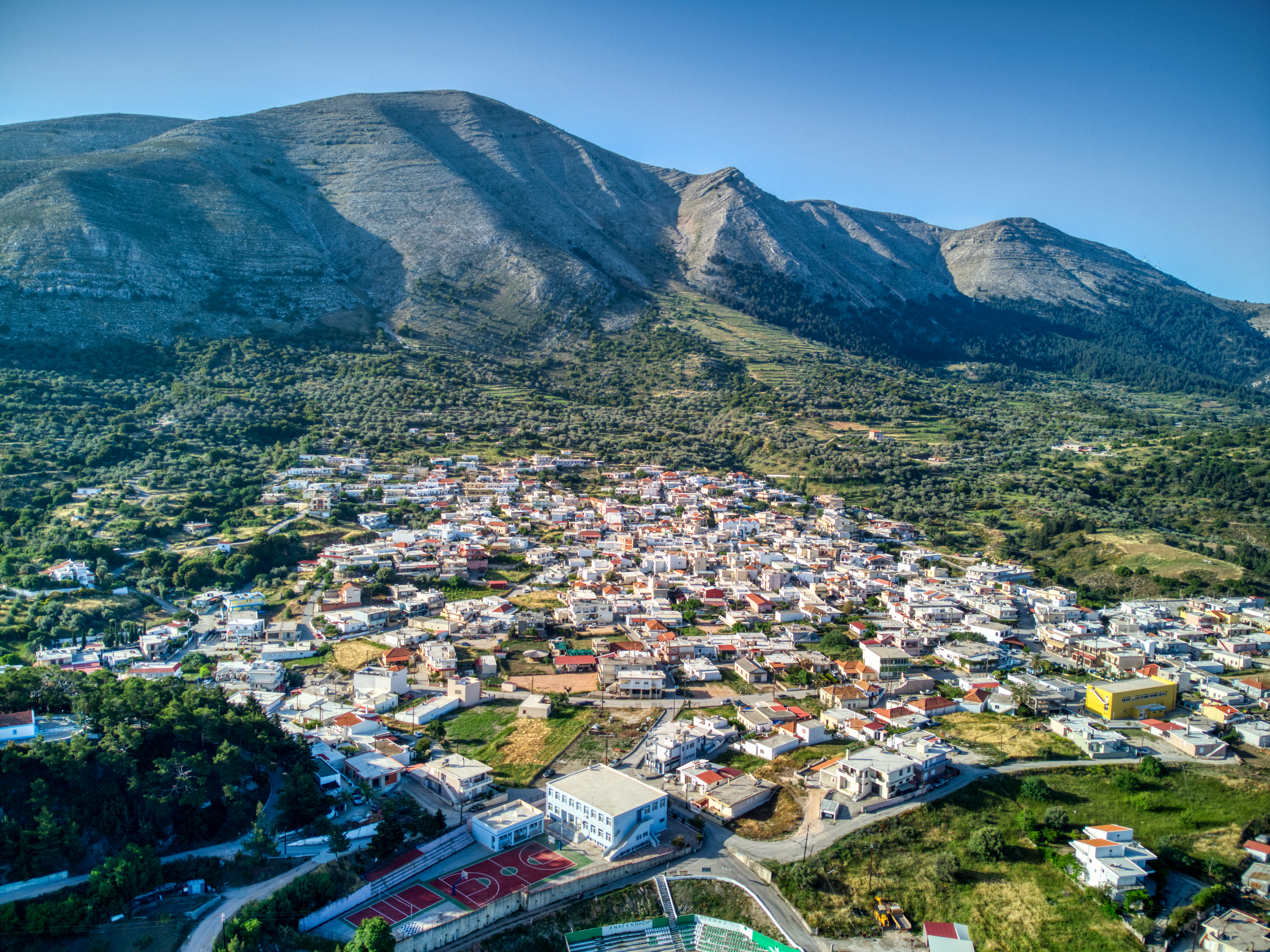

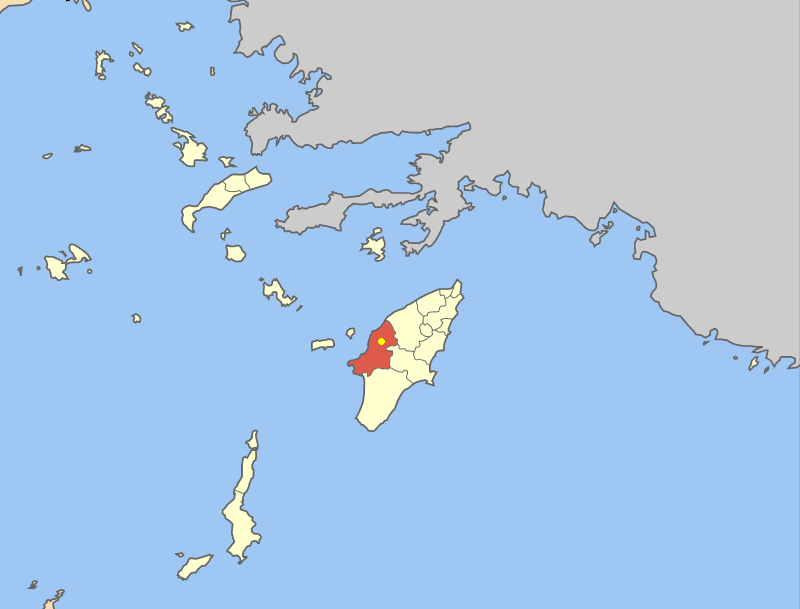
- Embonas (yellow dot) within Attavyros municipal unit (red)

- Location within Greece
- Coordinates: 36°13.7′N 27°51.5′E
- Country: Greece
- Administrative region: South Aegean
- Regional unit: Rhodes
- Municipality: Rhodes
- Municipal unit: Attavyros

Population (2021)
  - Community: 1,167
- Time zone: UTC+2 (EET)
  - Summer (DST): UTC+3 (EEST)

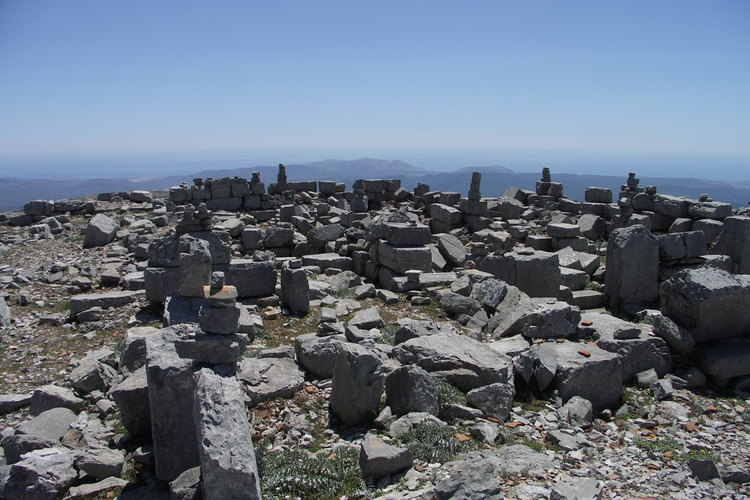
Ruins of the Temple of Zeus, on Attavyros Mountain

Embonas (Greek: Έμπωνας), sometimes transliterated Emponas, is a Greek mountain village, seat of the municipal unit of Attavyros, on the island of Rhodes, South Aegean region. In 2021 its population was 1,167; this includes the locality of Mandriko (Μανδρικό).

== Overview ==
It is located halfway up the Attavyros, a gray rocky mountain of 1,215 m height. On the top is a temple of Zeus. The village is the centre of wine industry on Rhodes and attracts many tourist daytrips.
