= Kiotari =

Kiotari Κιοτάρι
- Community
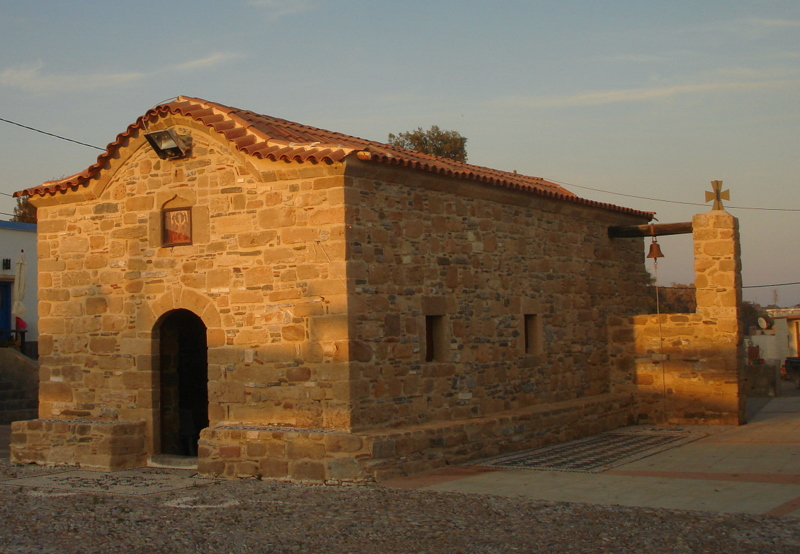
- Church of the Transfiguration of the Saviour (Μεταμόρφωση Σωτήρος)

- Location within Greece
- Coordinates: 36°2′46″N 27°57′16″E
- Country: Greece
- Administrative region: South Aegean
- Regional unit: Rhodes
- Municipality: Rhodes
- Municipal unit: Asklipieio

Population (2021)
  - Community: 281
- Time zone: UTC+2 (EET)
  - Summer (DST): UTC+3 (EEST)
- Postal code: 851 09

Kiotari (Κιοτάρι) is a coastal village on the southeastern coast of the island of Rhodes, in the Dodecanese, Greece. As of the 2021 census, it had a population of 281 permanent residents.

== History ==
Historically, Kiotari was a fishing village with its economy centered on traditional coastal activities. In recent decades, the village has undergone significant transformation driven by the growth of tourism, leading to the development of hotels, all-inclusive resorts, and other tourist-oriented infrastructure.

In 2023, the village was severely affected by wildfires, causing widespread damage to the natural landscape and infrastructure, necessitating the evacuation of residents and tourists.

== Population ==
The population of Kiotari has been recorded in the national censuses of Greece, indicating a steady increase in its permanent population over the years.

Year	Permanent population	De facto population
1991	32	106
2001	115	122
2011	163	2,876
2021	281	N/A

== Transport ==
Kiotari is connected to the rest of Rhodes by a public bus service, operated by KTEL Rodou A.E. This service provides regular routes to major destinations on the island, including the city of Rhodes and Lindos.
