= Prasonisi =

Cape in Rhodes, Greece

Coordinates: 35°52′57″N 27°45′40″E

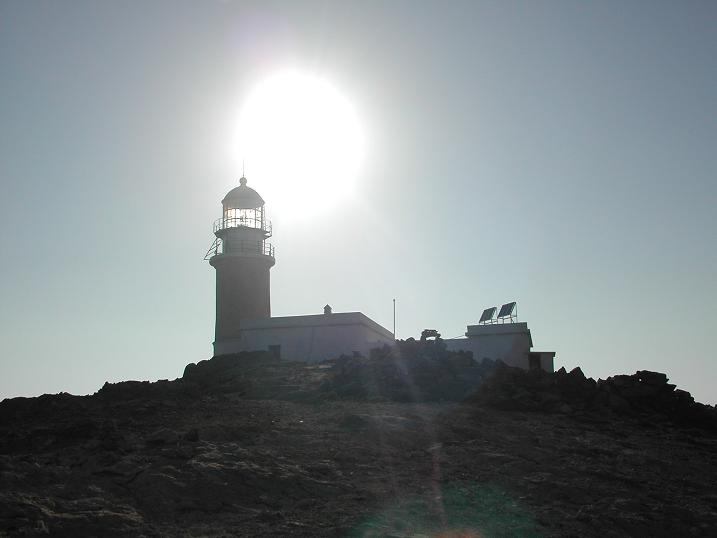
Prasonisi Lighthouse

Prasonisi (also Prassoníssi) cape is a part of the island of Rhodes. It is located 92 km from Rhodes town; 40 kilometers from Lindos, at the southern part of Rhodes.

== Overview ==
Prasonisi is the Greek word for "green island". During the summer, and when water levels are low enough, this island is a peninsula attached to Rhodes by a tombolo. During the winter time, and when water levels are high enough, Prasonisi becomes an island. The southernmost tip of Prasonisi contains the Prasonisi Lighthouse. The closest Greek village is Katavia; however, there is a purpose-built settlement on Prasonisi that contains motels, convenience stores, restaurants, and windsurf rentals which are open seasonally. Near Prasonisi is Vroulia, an ancient settlement that contains an old mosaic tiled floor.

== Watersports ==
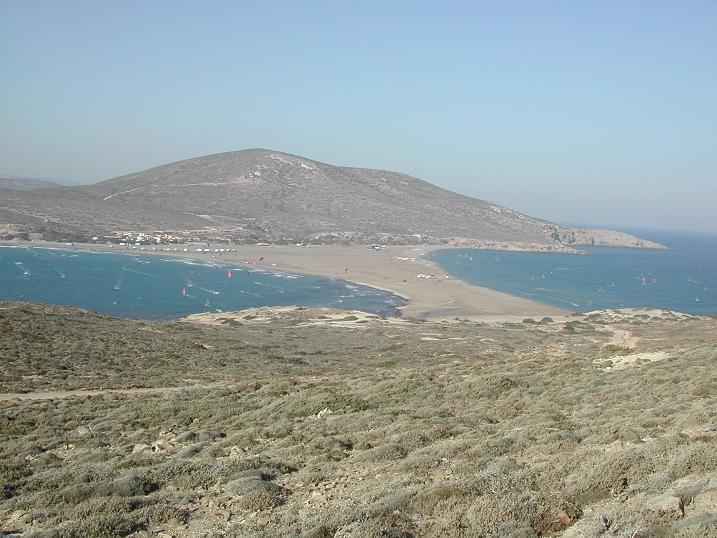
Prasonisi

Prasonisi is known as a destination for desirable windsurfing and kitesurfing due to predictable and reliable winds with certain qualities (not gusty, constant direction and during particular times of the day). From one side of the cape there is the Aegean Sea with good waves and views for advanced surfers. From the other side, there is the Mediterranean Sea with flat water which is better suited for beginners. The area has its high season for tourists in July and August, and the flat side of the water becomes very busy.

== Prasonisi Environmental Deterioration ==
Due to the large number of tourists that gather there, Prasonisi has lost its pristine beauty and there is substantial evidence of environmental damage. Visitors (mostly tourists) used to drive all around the beach with scooters and cars. As such, the sand has become compacted and has solidified, and it is almost like concrete at certain parts of the beach, although this is changing since the creation of a line that cannot be crossed by vehicles. The protected turtle, known as Caretta caretta, used to hide its eggs at the specific region, but this rarely happens anymore due to the lack of environmental management of the territory. For this reason, rigorous protective measures have to be undertaken to protect virgin nature landscapes and ancient archaeological sites in the area.

The local authorities have been unable to organize any services or take the appropriate steps to ensure the preservation of the area. Large motor homes are allowed onto certain areas of the sandbar without any charged fees which could have been a source of revenue to provide services such as sanitary, water etc. to the motor home users and other Prasonisi visitors.

The sandy isthmus, or tombolo, that connects the island to Rhodes in the summer is not a constant formation. The tombolo requires sand deposits from wave currents and patterns to build up the landmass. While the island does protect it from rogue wave patterns from the northeast that would erode the deposits, waves from the southeast can erode the landmass.

Prasonisi is included in the Natura 2000 as an environmental protected area.
