= Attavyros =

Mountain in Greece

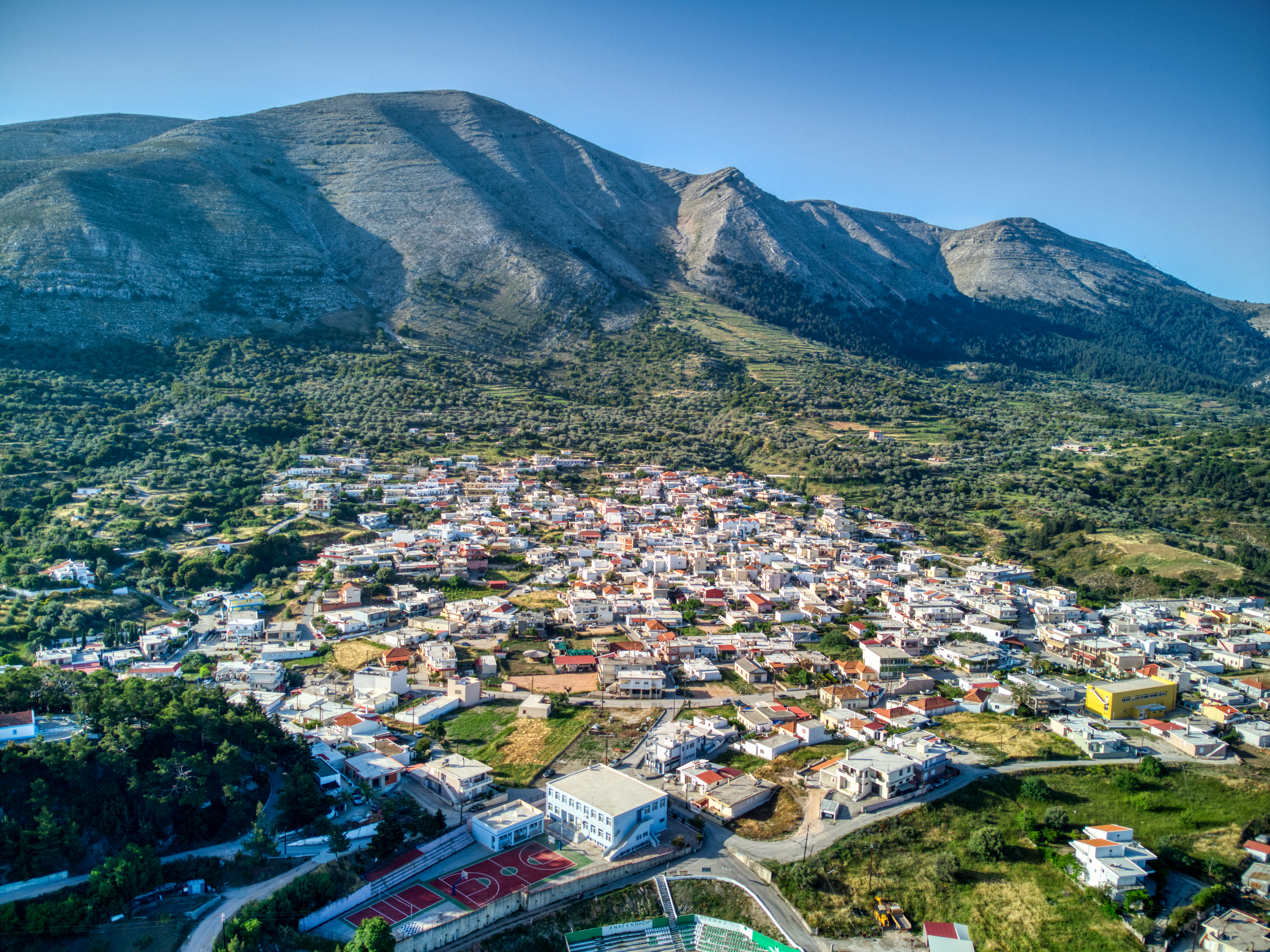
- Attavyros

Highest point
- Elevation: 1,215 m (3,986 ft)
- Prominence: 1,215 m (3,986 ft)
- Coordinates: 36°12′33″N 27°51′49″E

Geography
- Location within Greece
- Location: Rhodes, Greece

Attavyros (Greek: Αττάβυρος) or Atavyros (Ατάβυρος) or Atabyron (Ancient Greek: Ἀτάβυρον) is the highest mountain on the island of Rhodes in the Dodecanese in Greece. It rises to a height of 1,215 m. It lies to the south of the village of Embonas.

== Flora and Fauna ==
The lower slopes of the mountain are largely forested with Pinus brutia and Cupressus sempervirens, as well as maquis shrubland. They are also home to the peony species Paeonia clusii subsp. rhodia, as well as orchids.

Mammals include the deer Dama dama and the Rhodes badger Meles canescens subsp. rhodius.

Ant species include Aphaenogaster balcanica, festae, and sporadis; Camponotus aegeus, aethiops, boghossiani, gestroi, kiesenwetteri, oertzenii, lateralis and samius; Colobopsis truncata; Crematogaster ionia; Lepisiota melas; Messor wasmanni; Pheidole pallidula; Plagiolepis pallescens; Temnothorax antigoni and dessyi

=== Conservation ===
The mountain is part of a Natura 2000 special area of conservation since 2008, together with the neighbouring Mount Akramitis. The area is considered important for breeding raptors and species of open arid areas, as well as for seabirds.

== Mythology ==
In Greek mythology Althaemenes founded an altar to Zeus Atabyrios (Ἀταβύριος Ζεύς) on the mountain. He was said to have chosen the site as the only point on Rhodes from which his homeland of Crete could be seen. The remains of the sanctuary can be seen near the summit.

== Gallery ==
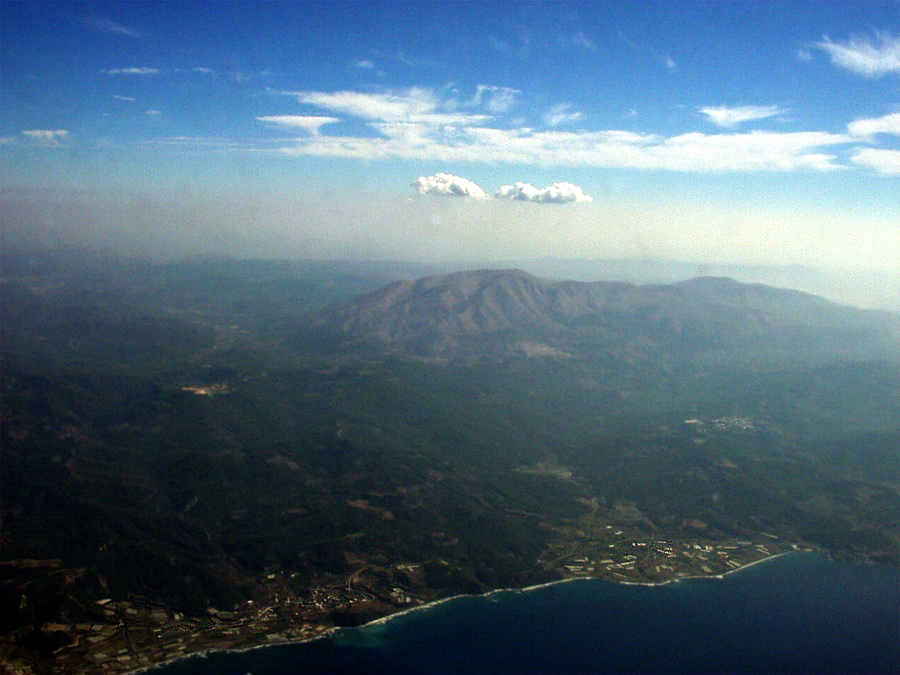
Aerial view of Attavyros

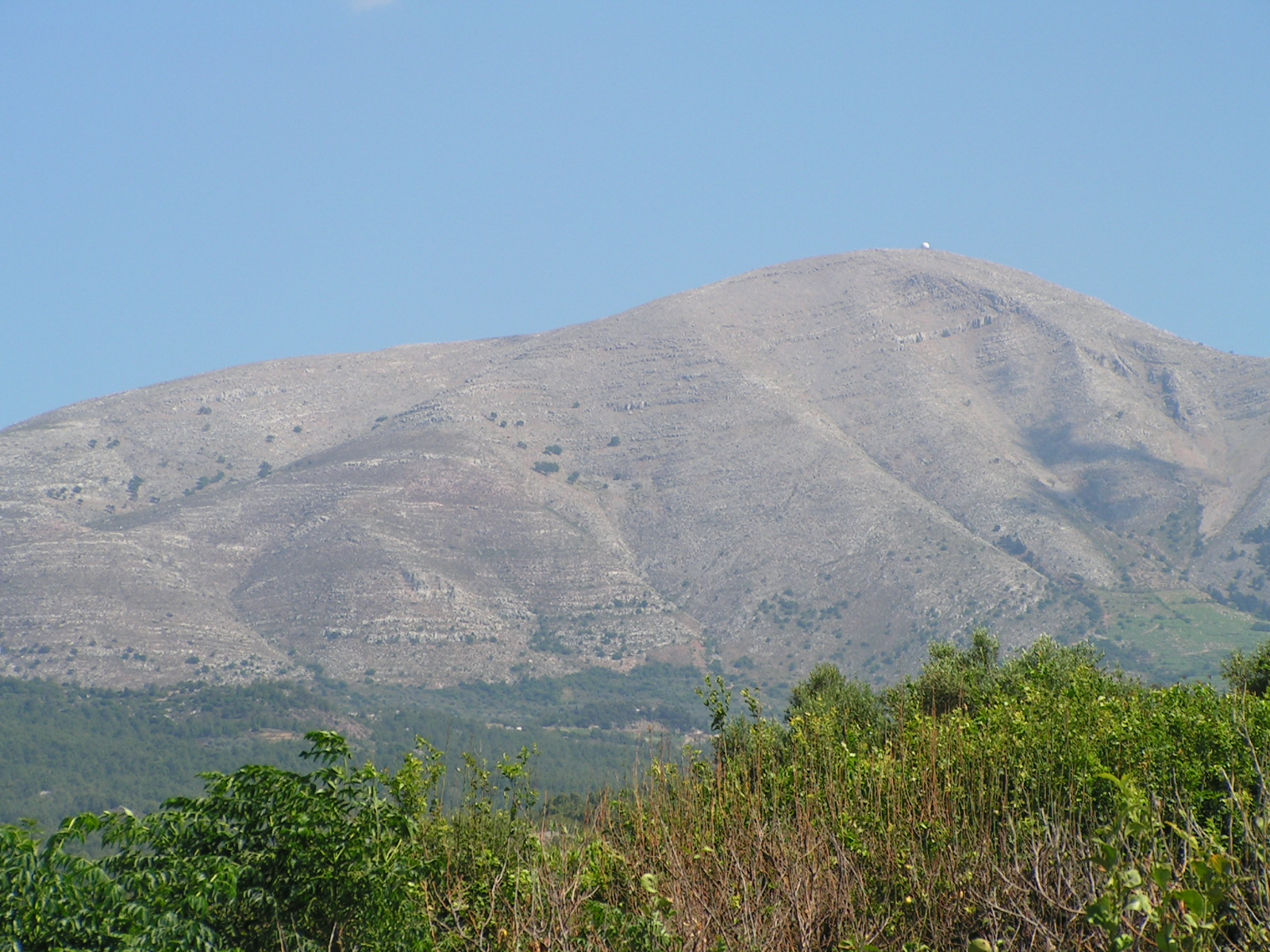
Attavyros

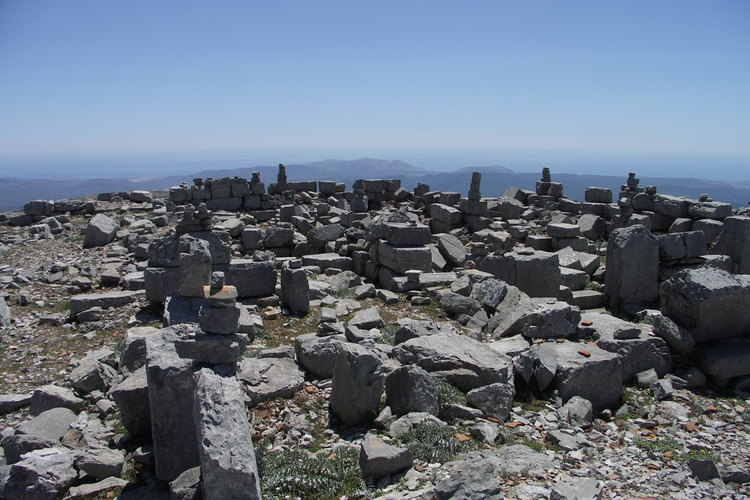
Temple of Zeus at the top of Attavyros
