= Balbo =

Balbo may refer to:

- Balbo (surname), including a list of people with the name
- Balbo (aircraft formation), a large formation of aircraft

== See also ==
- Balbo's game, a chess variant invented by G. Balbo in 1974
- Balbo sabretooth, a fish
- Balbau, or Bal'bo, a village in the Astara Rayon of Azerbaijan
