= History of the Jews in Rhodes =

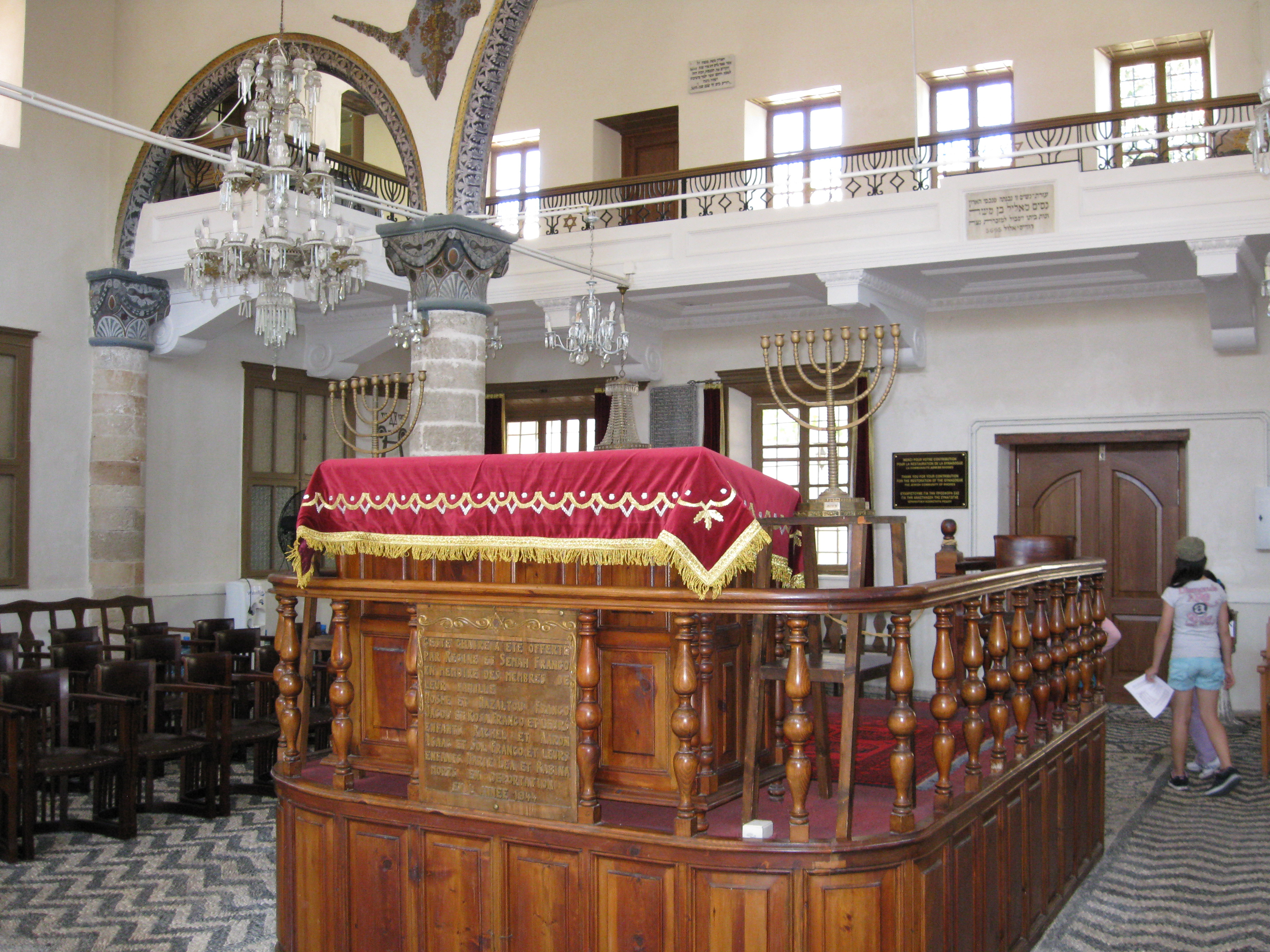
Kahal Shalom Synagogue

The Jews in Rhodes is an ancient Jewish community that existed in Rhodes at least from the 12th century and grew significantly since the expulsion from Spain in 1492. The arrival of Sephardic Jews following their expulsion from Spain revitalized and expanded the community, bringing with them rich cultural and religious traditions. Under Ottoman rule, the Jews of Rhodes enjoyed good relations, experiencing a period of relative peace and prosperity, particularly during the 16th and 17th centuries. This harmonious coexistence continued until the Italian occupation on May 12, 1912, which marked the beginning of a more challenging era for the Jewish community.

Following the Italian occupation, the community faced increasing restrictions and hardships. Before World War II, there were about 6,000 Jews living in Rhodes. The community was almost entirely destroyed in the Holocaust, and today there are about 40 Jews living on the island.

== History ==
=== Early History (Pre 1306) ===
The earliest mentions of a Jewish community on Rohdes come from 1 Maccabees. Simon Thassi is chosen to head a delegation of friendship sent to Rome. In accepting this delegation, Lucius Vitellius wrote a letter ordering areas to protect their Jewish population. This letter was sent to the island of Rhodes, implying that it had a Jewish population at the time. Another hint at the community's existence comes in the first quarter of the first century BC in the antisemitic writings of Apollonius Molon and Poseidonius, as both were from Rhodes. It implies the existence of a "culture war" between Greeks and Jews on the island at the time. After these mentions, we only get a few scattered mentions of the Jewish community until the Knights Hospitalier took over the island during a campaign lasting from 1306 to 1310. In 43 AD Herod Agrippa passed through the island. Paul passed through the island on his way to Miletus, and Jewish traders were active on the island during the 7th Century.

The first specific information about the Jews of Rhodes first emerges in the second half of the 12th century when the Jewish explorer Benjamin of Tudela visited the island. He wrote that the island was home to 400 Jews, jointly led by the Rabbi Hananel and Rabbi Eliah.

=== Crusader Rule (1306–1522) ===
Once Rhodes was conquered by the Knights Hospitaller in 1306, our knowledge of the Jewish presence becomes far clearer. When the Knights were planning the layout of the city of Rhodes. (It is possible this quarter had existed during Byzantine rule.) Like Jews in other Christian areas, the Jews of Rhodes were made second-class citizens. They were forced to pay extra taxes and subject to various kinds of discrimination. For example, if a Jew touched an item in a market, he was forced to buy it, because the island's Christians would see the item as tainted. But for the most part, the Knights seemed to have treated the Jews well and let them live as they wished.

The Knights themselves were a very diverse group, with individuals from Auvergne, Provence, France, Aragon, Castille, England, Germany, and Italy. They were also skilled businessmen, making large amounts of money from piracy against mostly Islamic, but occasionally Christian, vessels. Both of these factors had a large cultural impact on the Jewish community of Rhodes. A traveler to the island in 1480 notes that the Jewish women of the island were very skilled in working with silk.

The Jews of Rhodes had a synagogue near the city walls where they presumably also educated their children. There is evidence of a high level of religious scholarship among the community, Rabbi Michael Balbo of Candia wrote highly of the Rabbi Ezra of Rhodes and he corresponded with Rabbi Yedidiah son of Yosef Rak of Rhodes. While we don't have any sources commenting on their activities, its likely that these scholars played a significant role in the Jewish community of Rhodes.

The Jewish community of this time was made up of Greek speaking Romaniotes who had Greek surnames. Rhodian Jews during the 19th century believed the community of the time was also home the Sephardic refugees from Tarragona who came to Rhodes in 1280.

=== The Classic Community (1522–1944) ===
The Jewish community in Rhodes has a glorious and ancient history, and already Benjamin of Tudela reports at the end of the 12th century that he found four hundred Jews on the island. Obadiah of Bertinoro passed through the island in 1487, stayed about a month and a half, and praised the education of the island's Jews.

After the Expulsion of Jews from Spain in 1492, the community grew as many exiles found their home on the island and established a Sephardic Jewish community there. In the early 17th-century, a Jewish man named Levi was turned over to Rhodes' governor by his business partners during a dispute, leading to his forced conversion to Christianity under severe duress. Levi sought redress from a Constantinople rabbinical court, which ordered compensation; but when his wife fled to Alexandria, the Rhodes governor extorted a bribe from the Jewish community, accusing them of aiding her escape. The rabbi concluded that while the partners couldn't foresee the full impact of their actions, they were guilty of a serious offense, and the community could fine them as a deterrent.

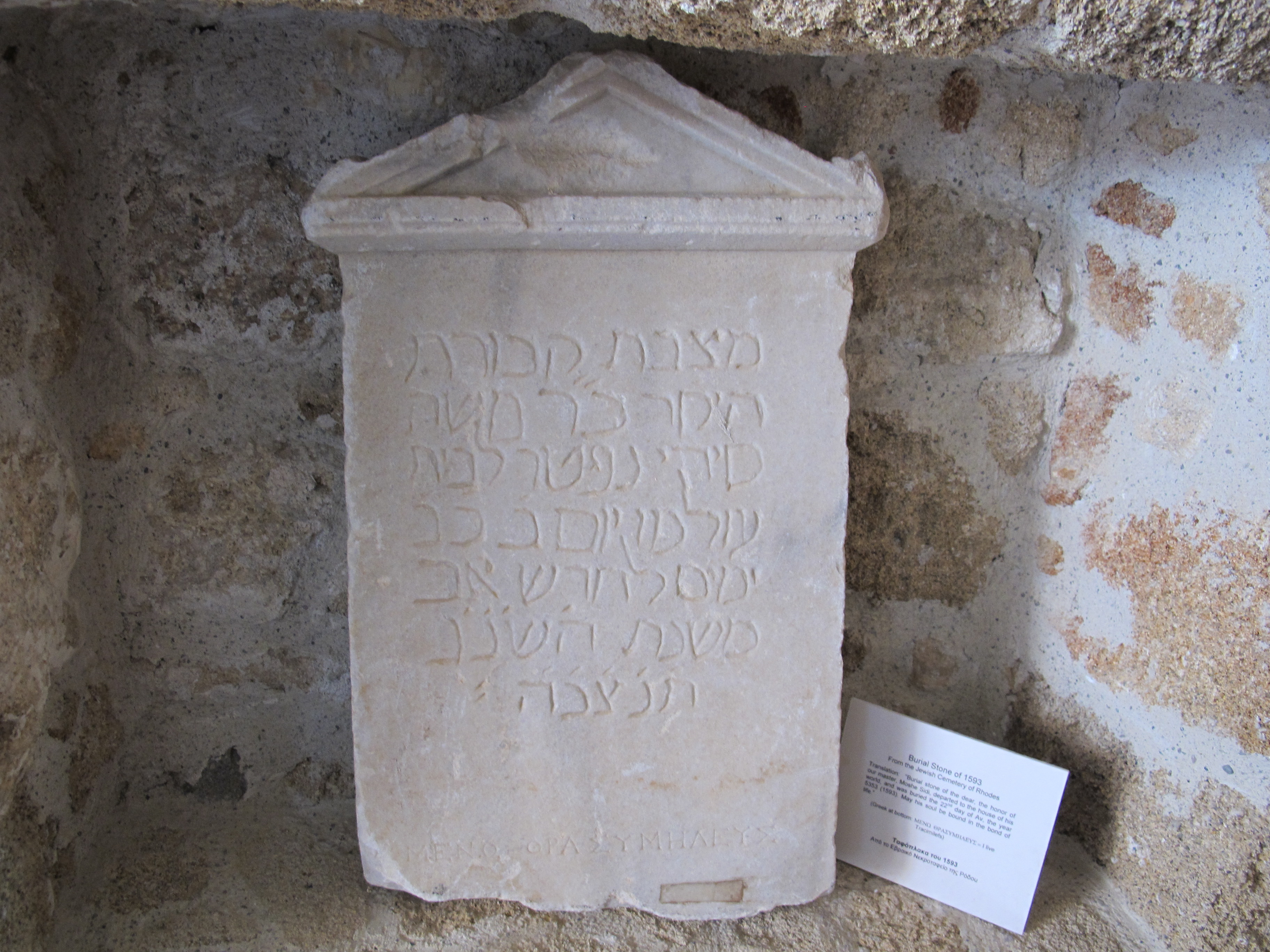
Jewish headstone dated 1593

The conquest of the island in 1522 by Suleiman the Magnificent, the Sultan of the Ottoman Empire, was beneficial for the status of the Jews on the island and their number increased. In 1523, one hundred and fifty Jewish families from Thessaloniki were resettled in Rhodes by the Ottomans. According to the Encyclopaedia Judaica, Solomon Ibn Verga, an exile from Portugal, arrived from Pisa in Italy to Rhodes and died there in 1533, after the conquest of the island. The Ottoman rule was beneficial for the Jews and allowed them to continue living within the city walls, something that was forbidden for Christians. In the Jewish quarter La Juderia, six synagogues operated, including the Kahal Shalom Synagogue, as well as yeshivas, and the Jews were involved in all crafts, including trade, medicine, weapons manufacturing, weaving, and more. In 1927, a rabbinical seminary was established on the island with the support of the Italian government.

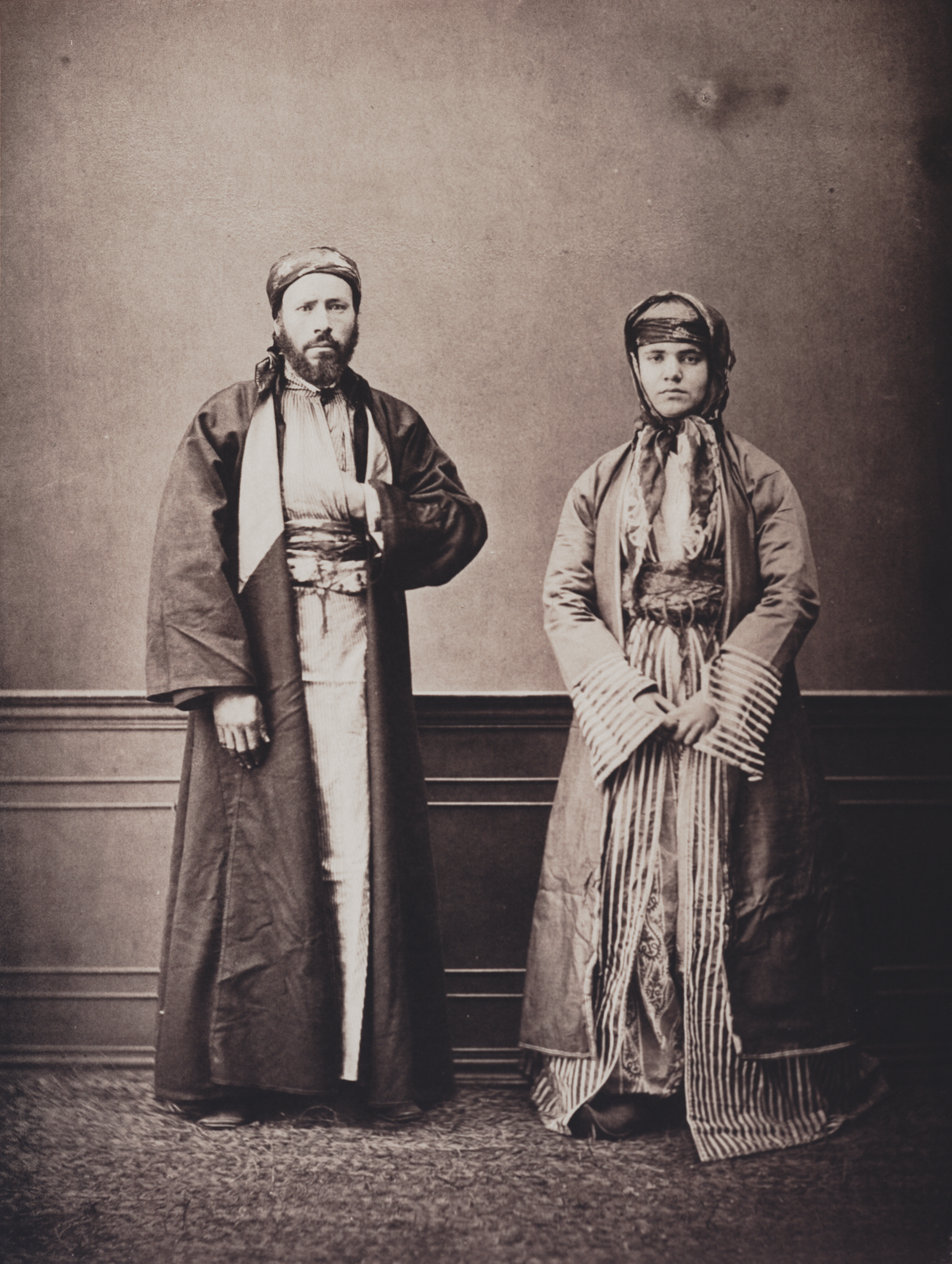
Jews of Rhodes, 1873

In 1840, the community suffered from the blood libel in Rhodes. After a Jewish merchant from Smyrna sent a broker to Rhodes to deal in sponges, the Rhodian Greeks, viewing the broker as a dangerous competitor, accused a poor peddler of murdering a 10-year-old Christian child. The police imprisoned the peddler and forced him to implicate other Jews in the community as participants in the crime, resulting to a mass arrest of ten Jewish leaders, including their rabbi, Michael Yaacob Israel, on Purim eve. After a similar blood libel on the Jews of Damascus, Moses Montefiore, a British financer and Jewish activist, received an audience with Sultan Abdülmecid I on October 28, 1840. The Sultan gave a firman declaring the innocence of the Jews of Damascus and Rhodes, stating that a thorough inspection of the Jewish customs had been made, and that they are forbidden by their own law to consume animal blood, let alone human blood.

Towards the end of the 19th century, the Jews were the second-largest religious group on the island, with their community numbering 11,000 souls out of 28,000 inhabitants. After the Italian conquest at the beginning of the 20th century, many Jews left Rhodes, in their search for better livelihoods, or for fear of the declaration of antisemitic laws. Among other locations, some went to the community of the town of Milas, located near the city of Bodrum in Asia Minor. In 1930, the Jewish community numbered about 4,000 people out of 30,000 inhabitants of the island.

In 1887, the community numbered about 2,600 people out of 30,000 inhabitants of the city. As the Ottoman rule on the island came to an end, the Jewish community also declined in prominence, and many Jews left the island. The first to leave the island for Rhodesia and the Belgian Congo in Africa were the brothers Musa and Salmon Benatar, who arrived there as early as 1895. Following them, many other Jews from Rhodes migrated to the Belgian Congo, South Africa, and Rhodesia.

=== World War II and the Modern Community (1944–present) ===
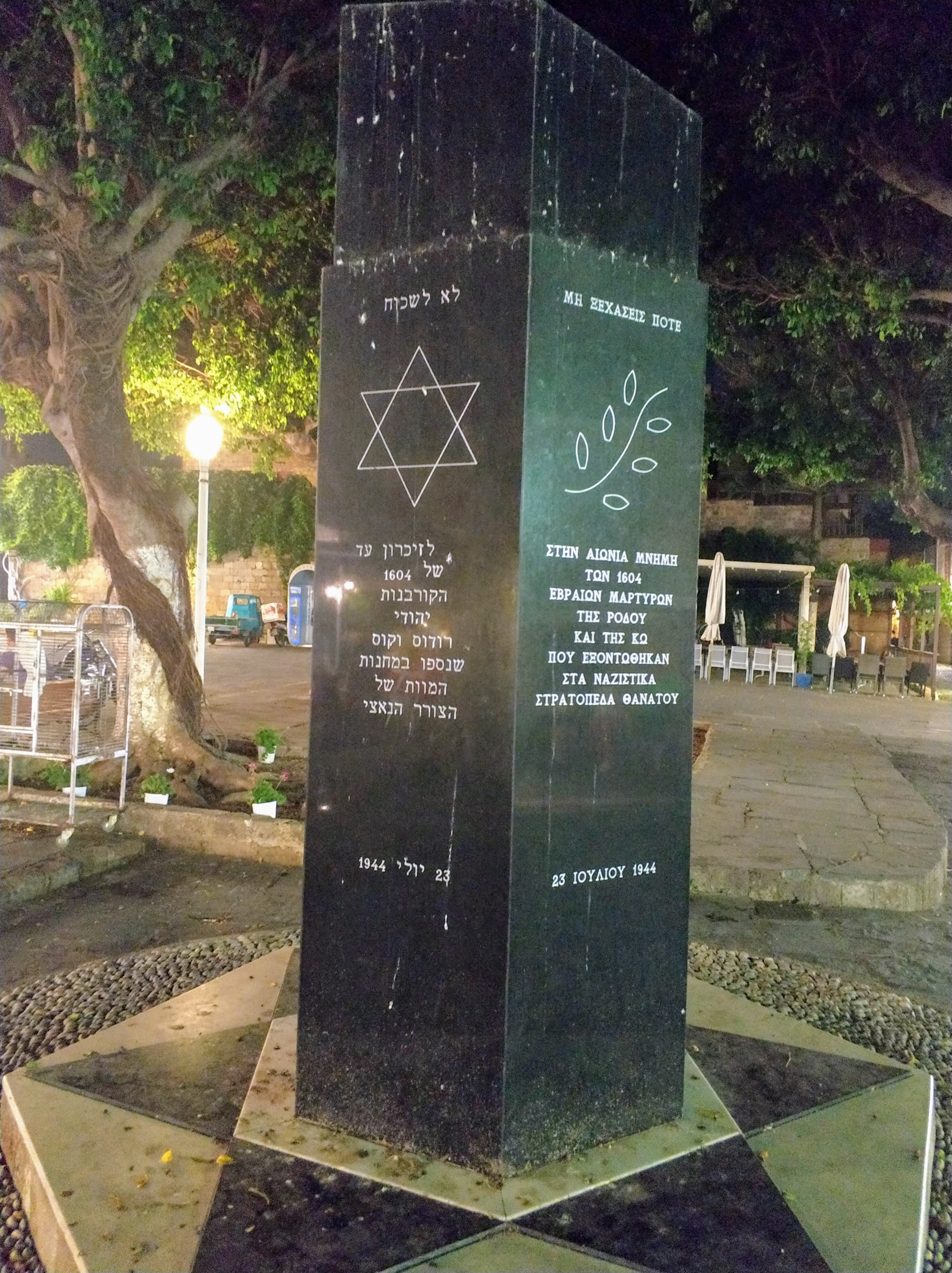
Monument to the Jews of Rhodes and Kos

Following the implementation of racial laws in Italy and with the outbreak of World War II, about 4,000 out of 6,000 Jews of Rhodes left the city. On July 23, 1944, the Germans concentrated 1,673 of the community's Jews in the Martyrs' Square in the Jewish quarter. They were taken to the port of the city of Rhodes, and were loaded onto cargo ferries that sailed towards the port of Piraeus, from which the Jews were taken to the Haidari concentration camp. Along the way, they picked up about 100 members of the Kos community. Seven Jews died during the journey from Rhodes to the port of Piraeus. On August 1, the Jews of Rhodes and Kos arrived at the Haidari camp, and after several weeks were sent to the Auschwitz extermination camp, where the community members were murdered except for 151 Jews from Rhodes who survived. The Turkish consul, Selahattin Ülkümen, managed to save 42 Jews by claiming they were Turkish citizens or had ties to Turkey.

Of the six synagogues that were in the city, only Kahal Shalom Synagogue stands today. In the synagogue and the adjacent rooms is located the Jewish Museum of Rhodes.

== Jewish Cemetery ==
The new Jewish Cemetery is located about 2 kilometers south of the Jewish quarter La Juderia. Initially, it was located near the old cemetery close to the Jewish quarter. After being appointed Governor of the Island of Rhodes, Cesare Maria De Vecchi was responsible for enacting the Italian racial laws – Wikipedia, which restricted the civil rights of Italian Jews, banned books written by Jewish authors, and excluded Jews from public offices and higher education. Additional laws stripped Jews of their assets, restricted travel, and finally, provided for their confinement in internal exile, as was done for political prisoners. In 1935 De Vecchi forced the Jewish community to relocate their cemetery from its historical location in the old city to its current location on the road to the Kallithea neighborhood and forcibly required that they furnish the tombstones of their ancestors for rebuilding the Palace of the Grand Master of the Knights of Rhodes.

At the entrance to the cemetery on the left, the rabbis of the Rhodes community are buried in a higher section. Next to that section there are ancient tombstones that were found after the cemetery was moved. To the right of the entrance, there is a small museum about the transfer of the graves. In the cemetery, there is a memorial for the Jews of Rhodes who were murdered in the Holocaust. There is an additional memorial for the missing persons of the immigrant ship Pancho.

== Demography ==
Year	Jews	Non-Jews	Total
1887	2,600	30,000	
End of the 19th century	11,000	28,000	39,000
1930	4,000	30,000	34,000
1940s	~2000		
2011	~40	115,450	115,490

== Rabbis of Rhodes ==
Name	Term of office	Notes
Rabbi Chaim ben Menachem Algazi		Author of the book "Bnei Chayi"
Rabbi Moshe Israel	1713–1736	Was on a journey between the years 1727–1731
Hacham Ezra Malki	1752–1768	
Rabbi Shmuel Yedidya Tarika		
Rabbi Avraham Halevi	???? – 1815	
Rabbi Chaim Yehuda Israel	1815–1821	
Rabbi Michael Yaakov Israel	1821–1833	Rabbi of Rhodes during the blood libel in Rhodes
Rabbi Raphael Yitzhak Israel	1833–1882	Later Chief Sephardic Rabbi of Jerusalem.
Rabbi Rachamim Chaim Yehuda Israel	1885–1891	
Rabbi Shabbetai Halevi	1891 – ????	
Rabbi Moshe Yehuda Franco	1896–1911	Later the 33rd Rishon LeZion
Rabbi Nissim Yehuda Danon		Rabbi of Rhodes during the Italian occupation in 1912. Later the 34th Rishon LeZion
Rabbi Reuven Eliyahu Israel	14th of Iyar 1921 – 20th of Tishrei 1933	The last Rabbi of Rhodes from the Israel family line

== Prayer rite ==
Siddur Zechut Yosef is the prayer rite of the Jews of Rhodes and it is slightly different from the Sephardic rite.
