= Maria Fragoudaki =

American painter

- Born: Greece
- Education: King’s College London
- Known for: Painting and sculpture
- Movement: Surrealism

Maria Fragoudaki (Greek: Μαρία Φραγκουδάκη; b. 1983, Greece), is a New York-based contemporary, interdisciplinary artist who draws on a variety of media and practices, such as painting, sculpture, dance and performance.

== Work ==
Fragoudaki holds a degree in Chemistry from King's College London and has presented her work in numerous group and solo shows at venues throughout Europe, the US and Japan. Some of her exhibitions included The Royal Academy of Arts in London, the Jewish Museum of Greece, Scope Miami, Scope Basel, the Historical and Folklore Museum of Aegina in Greece and the Goulandris Natural History Museum in Athens

In April 2017, Fragoudaki staged a performance titled ‘BedSheets: The Duality of Freedom,’ at Athens's Syntagma Square. In 2026, she presented a solo exhibition “YOU – Remember Me. No Blue, No Green. Earth – Stand Free. Inspire. Care" inspired by NASA’s Artemis II mission.
