= Asxanakəran =

Village in Astara, Azerbaijan

- Municipality
- Location within Azerbaijan
- Coordinates: 38°31′42″N 48°37′32″E
- Country: Azerbaijan
- Rayon: Astara

Population
  - Total: 1,066
- Time zone: UTC+4 (AZT)

Asxanakəran (also, Askhanakeran) is a village and municipality in the Astara Rayon of Azerbaijan. It has a population of 1,066. The municipality consists of the villages of Asxanakəran, Azaru, Balbau, Bursut, and Dəstor.
