= La Juderia =

Coordinates: 36.442°N 28.230°E

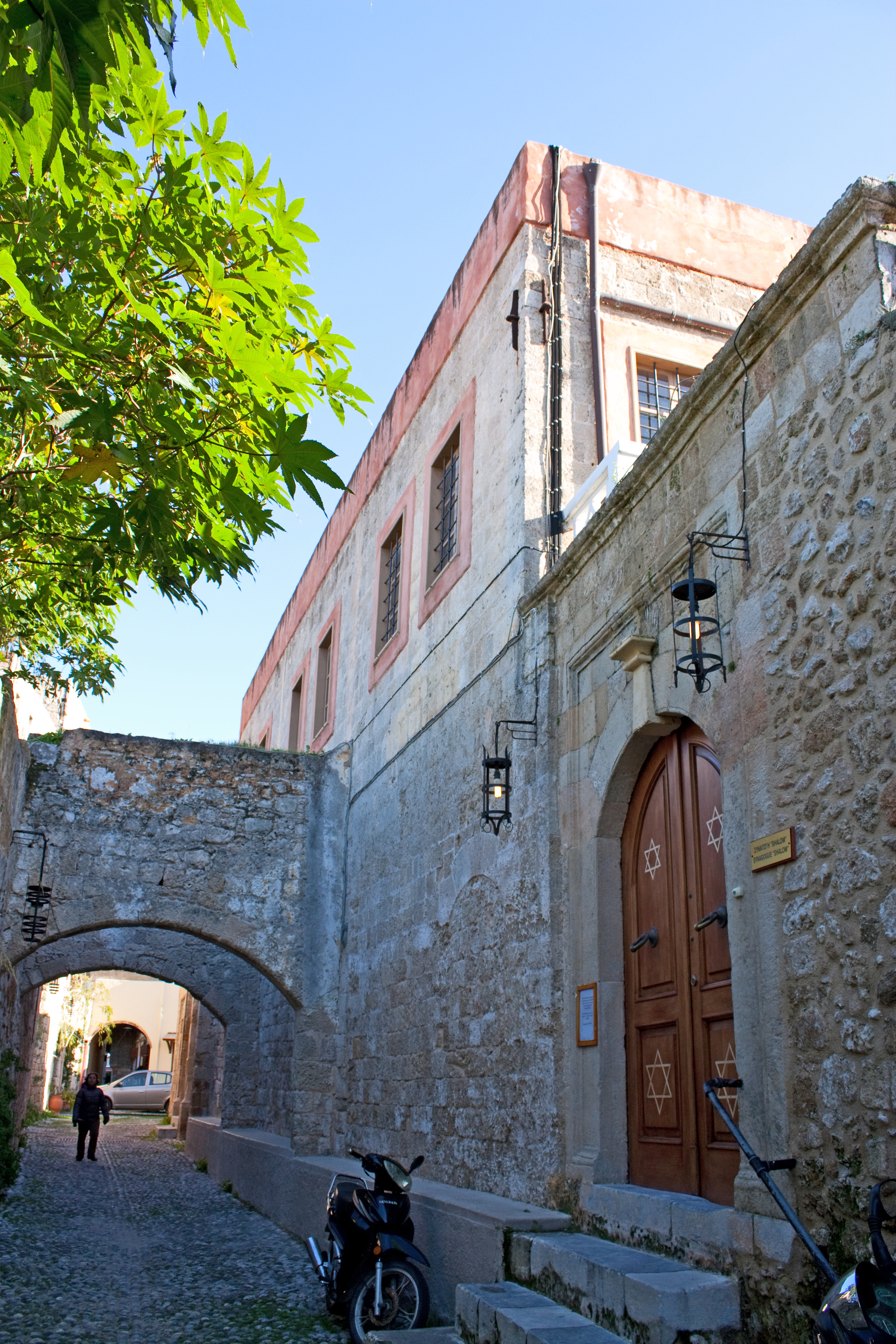
Entrance of Kahal Shalom Synagogue

La Juderia (Ladino: לה ג׳ודיריה) was the former Jewish quarter of the city of Rhodes, Greece. The quarter was inhabited by Sephardic, Ladino-speaking Jews.

== History ==
Although there has been a Jewish presence of some sort on the island of Rhodes for nearly 2,000 years, the inhabitants of La Juderia did not arrive until the 16th century, after they were expelled from Spain. In the Jewish quarter La Juderia, six synagogues operated, including the Kahal Shalom Synagogue, as well as yeshivas, and the Jews were involved in all crafts, including trade, medicine, weapons manufacturing, weaving, and more. In 1927, a rabbinical seminary was established on the island with the support of the Italian government. The Jews of Rhodes prospered until the persecutions of Italian Fascism began in the 1930s, and at its peak the population of the Jewish quarter was more than 4,000.

== Geography and features ==
La Juderia is located in the eastern part of the Old City of Rhodes, near a pier used by cruise ships. It is primarily centered on the Dossiadou Street where the Kahal Shalom Synagogue, the lone remaining Jewish house of worship on the island of the six that once stood, is located, along with the Jewish Museum of Rhodes. Other features in the quarter include the Square of the Martyred Jews, which pays tribute to the Jews of Rhodes who were murdered in the Holocaust, located near the heart of the neighborhood, the Alliance Israélite Universelle school, the former site of the Kahal Grande Synagogue, and a number of plaques throughout the quarter in Ladino, Hebrew and Italian. Outside the Juderia is the Jewish cemetery of Rhodes, which dates from the 16th century and is one of the best preserved in Europe.

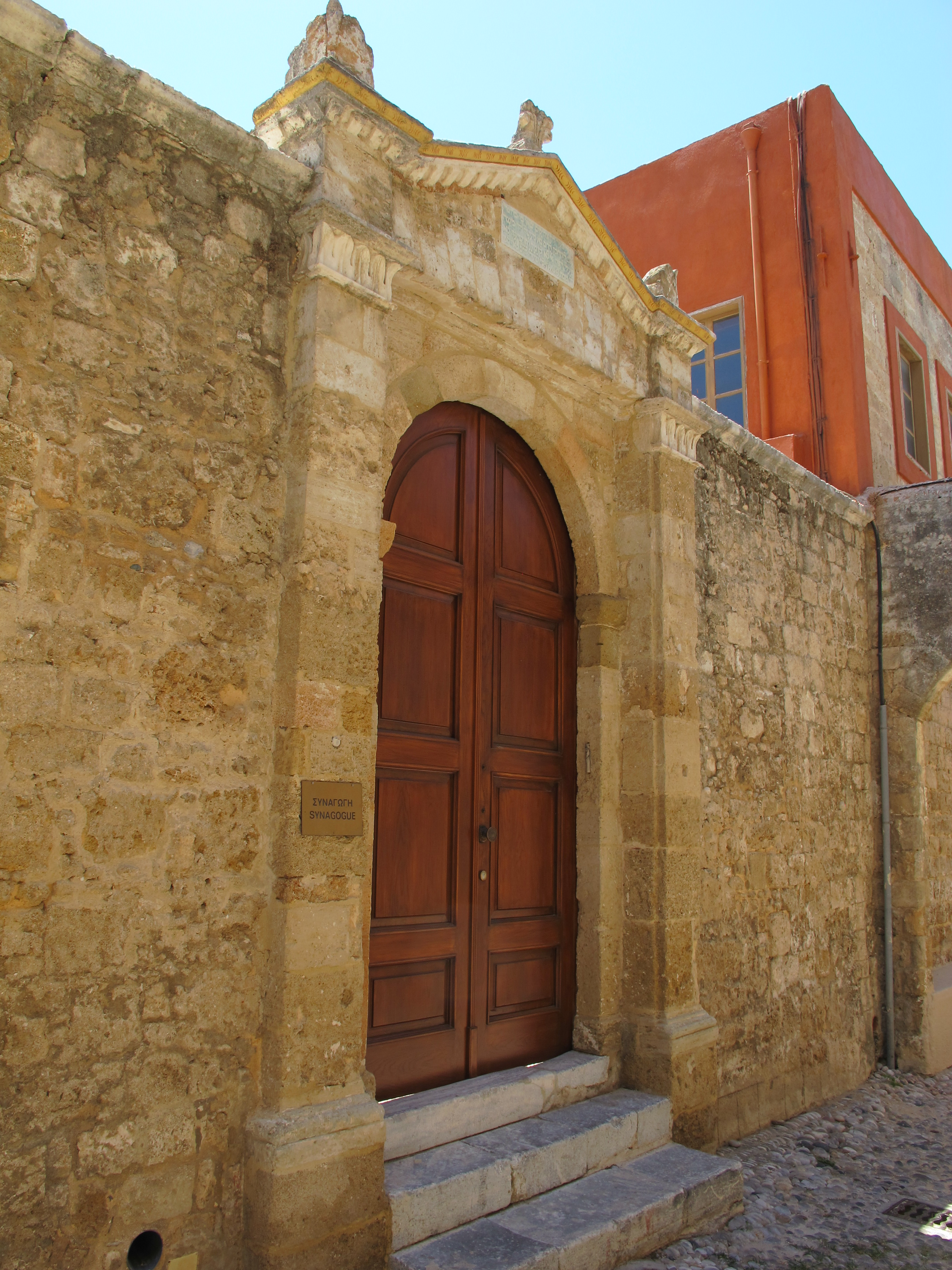
Entrance of the Jewish Museum of Rhodes

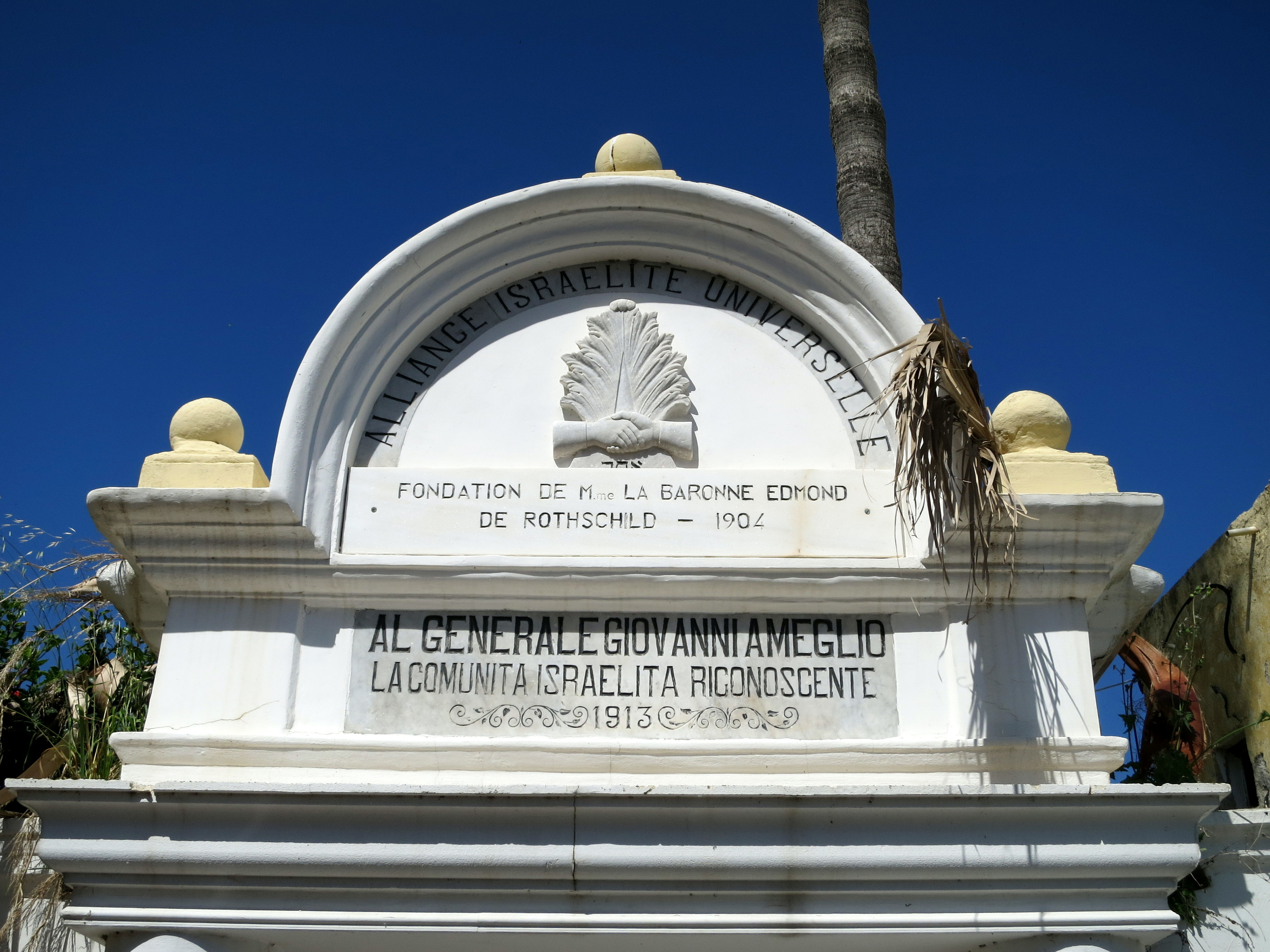
Inscriptions at the fountain in front of the former school of the Alliance Israélite Universelle

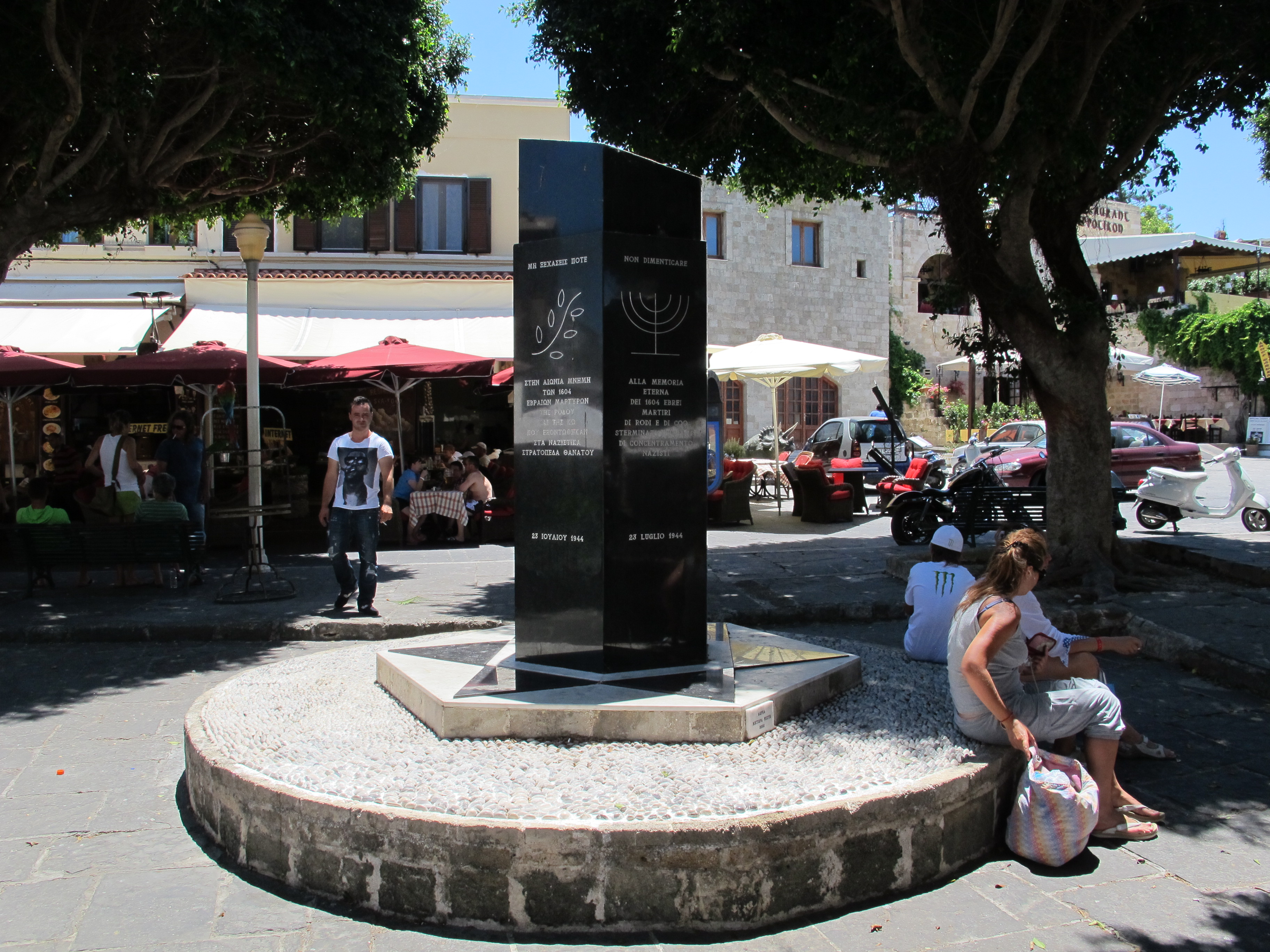
Holocaust Monument in the Square of the Martyred Jews

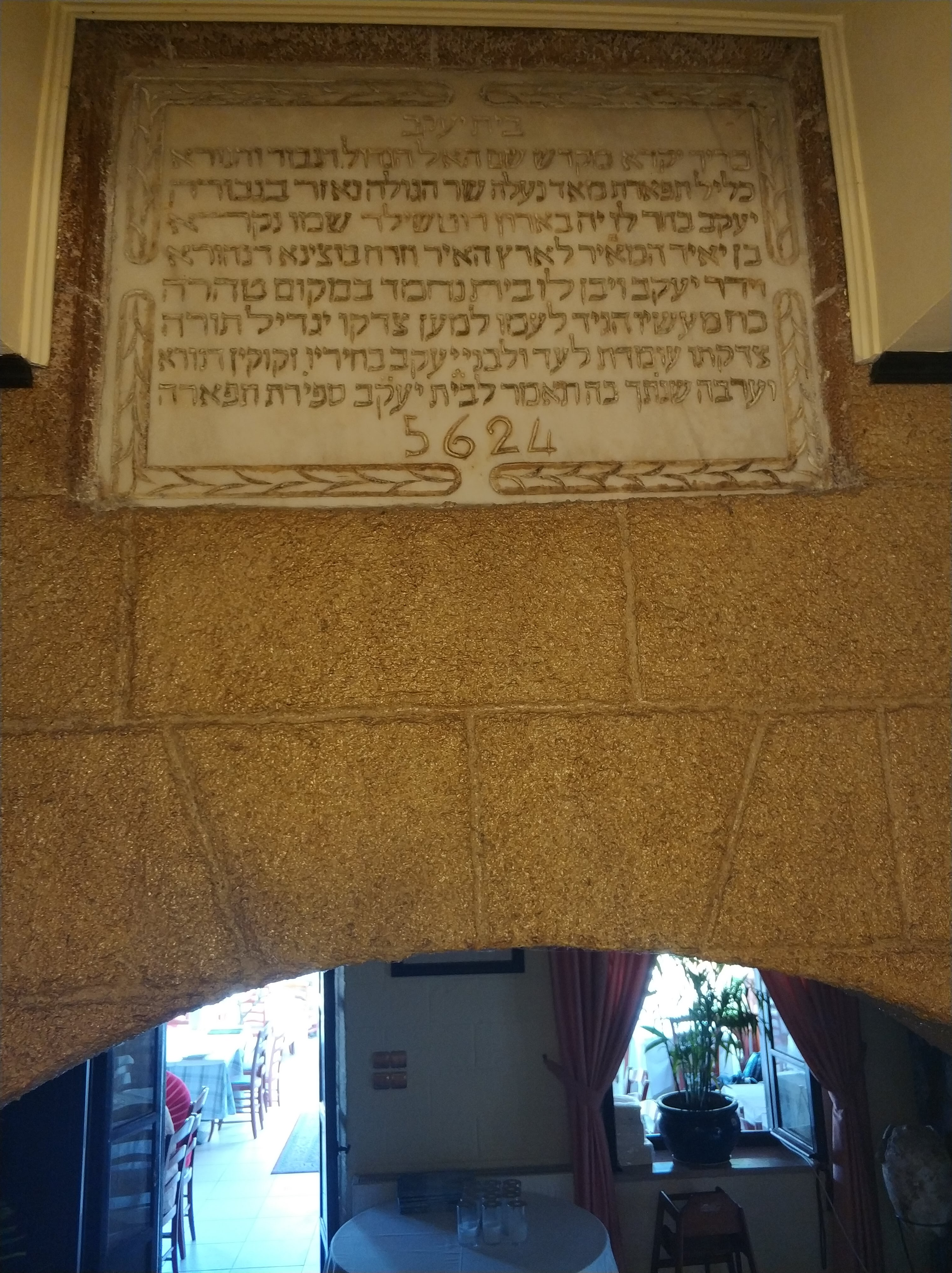
Plaque

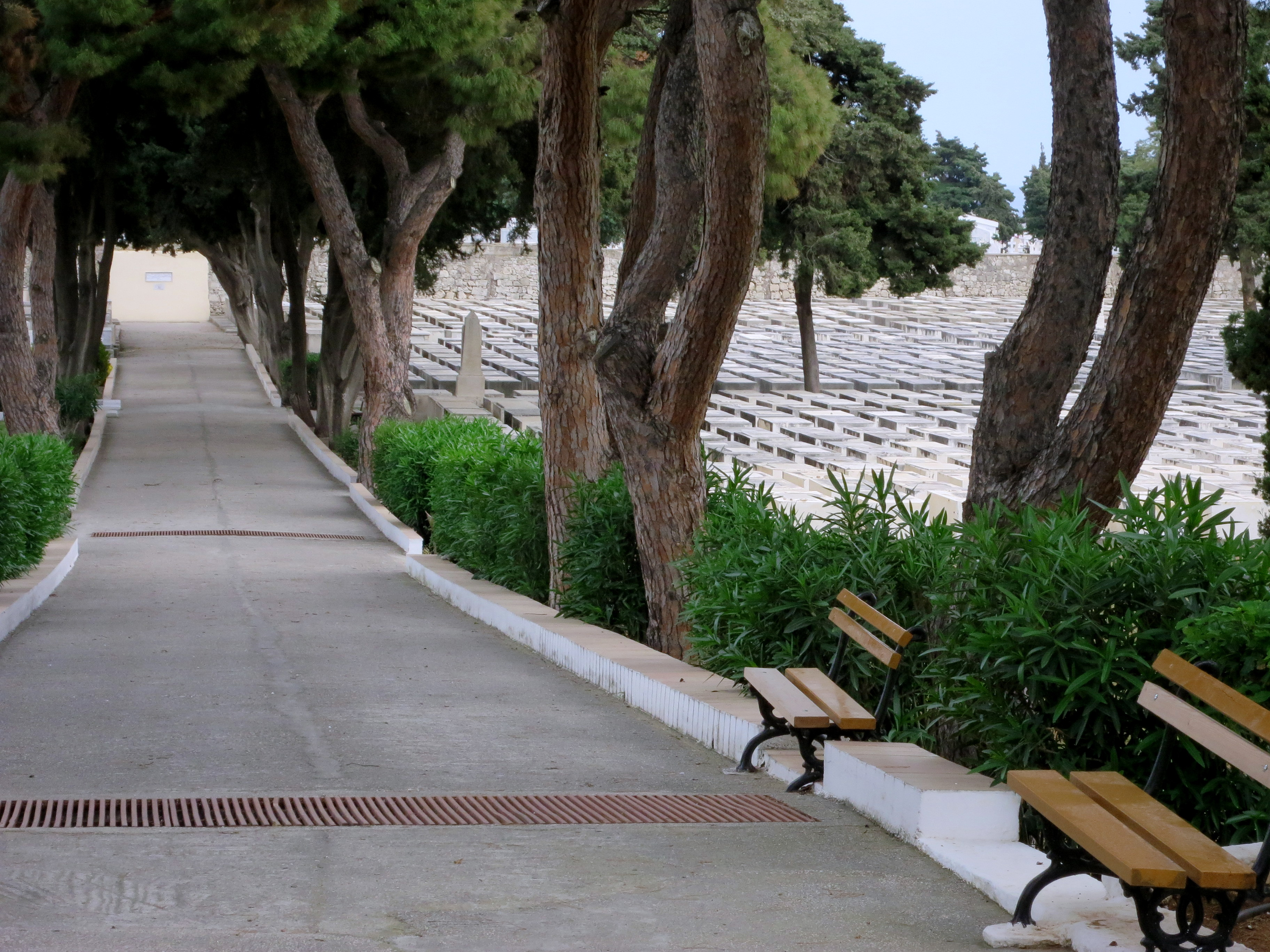
Jewish cemetery of Rhodes
