= Kahal Shalom Synagogue =

Orthodox synagogue in Rhodes, Greece

Kahal Kadosh Shalom Synagogue
- Hebrew: בית הכנסת קהל קדוש שלום; Greek: Συναγωγή Καχάλ Σαλόμ
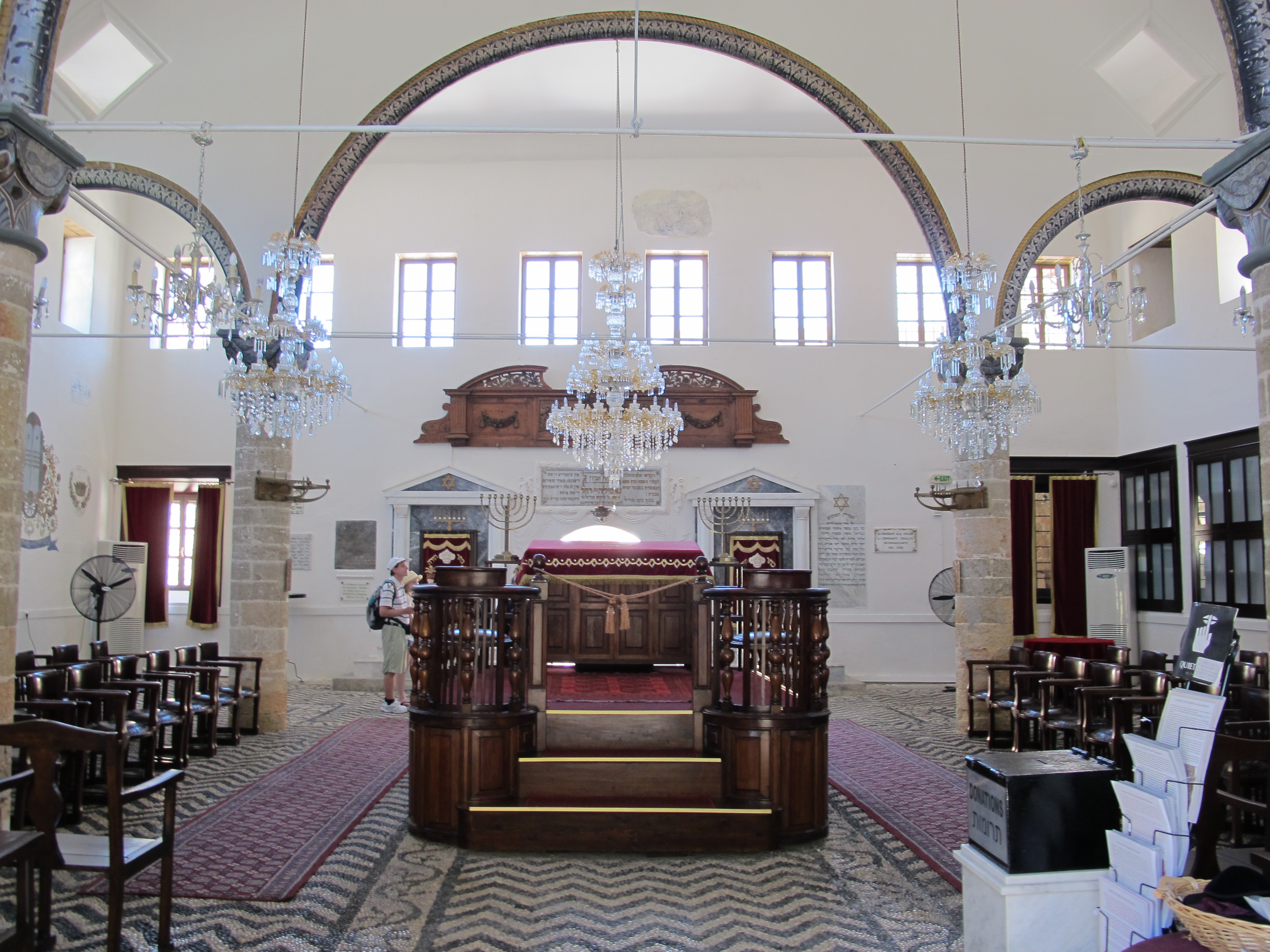
- The synagogue interior, in 2013

- Location of the synagogue in the South Aegean Sea

Religion
- Affiliation: Orthodox Judaism
- Rite: Sephardi
- Ecclesiastical or organizational status: Synagogue; Jewish museum
- Status: Active (summer only)

Location
- Location: 8 Simiou Street, La Juderia, Rhodes, Rhodes, South Aegean
- Country: Greece
- Interactive map of Kahal Kadosh Shalom Synagogue
- Coordinates: 36°26′32″N 28°13′49″E

Architecture
- Type: Synagogue architecture
- Completed: 1577

The Kahal Shalom Synagogue (Hebrew: בית הכנסת קהל קדוש שלום, romanized: Beit HaKnesset Kahal Kadosh Shalom, lit. 'Synagogue of the Holy Congregation of Peace'; Greek: Συναγωγή Καχάλ Σαλόμ) is an Orthodox Jewish congregation and synagogue, located in La Juderia, the Jewish quarter of the city of Rhodes on the island of Rhodes, in the South Aegean region of Greece. Completed in 1577, the synagogue building is the oldest synagogue in Greece. The congregation worships in the Eastern Sephardi rite, predominately in summer months only.

The synagogue building contains the Jewish Museum of Rhodes, a Jewish museum, that details the history of the community. Services are held on holidays, and the building is also used for community events.

== History ==
There has been a Jewish presence in Rhodes for 2,300 years. They were, at times, persecuted by Romans, the Knights Hospitaller, and other rulers of the islands. During Ottoman rule, however, the Jews of Rhodes prospered, and many expelled Sephardim settled there, particularly in the city of Rhodes, where they built many synagogues (there were six, including Kahal Shalom, in La Juderia, at one time).

The Kahal Shalom Synagogue was constructed in 1577 (5338 in the Hebrew calendar), and has been in use ever since. The synagogue and its worshipers prospered under Ottoman rule into the twentieth century. However, the Kingdom of Italy took over the Dodecanese Islands in 1912, and large numbers of the Jews of Rhodes had begun to emigrate during the 1930s, as they felt menaced by the Fascist Italian regime. When the Italian Fascist government fell, the island came under direct German control in 1943, and more than 1,550 of the remaining 1,700 Jews were deported and murdered in concentration camps, largely putting an end to the use of Kahal Shalom. Kahal Shalom was the only of the four synagogues in La Juderia at the time to survive the bombing during World War II.

Kahal Shalom is only used for services during the summer, when there is an influx of Jewish tourists and Rhodeslis (Jews hailing from Rhodes) as there are only 35 Jews on the island today, and as the headquarters for the Jewish Museum of Rhodes.

=== Layout ===
Most features of the Kahal Shalom Synagogue are typical of Sephardic and Ottoman synagogues. The bimah, or podium, from which the Sefer Torah is read, is in the center of the sanctuary, as in most Sephardic houses of worship. The floor is a mosaic using the black and white local stones used in pavements around Rhodes. An unusual feature of the temple is the fact that there are two hekháls (Torah arks), on either side of the door leading into the interior courtyard. There is also a fountain in the courtyard used for handwashing by the Kohanim before reciting the priestly blessings.

=== Plaques ===
A number of plaques adorn the exterior and interior of the synagogue. Most, primarily in Ladino, the language of the Sephardic community, and Hebrew are dedicated to those who maintained the synagogue. Another, in French, is dedicated to the members of the community who were murdered during the Holocaust.

== Gallery ==
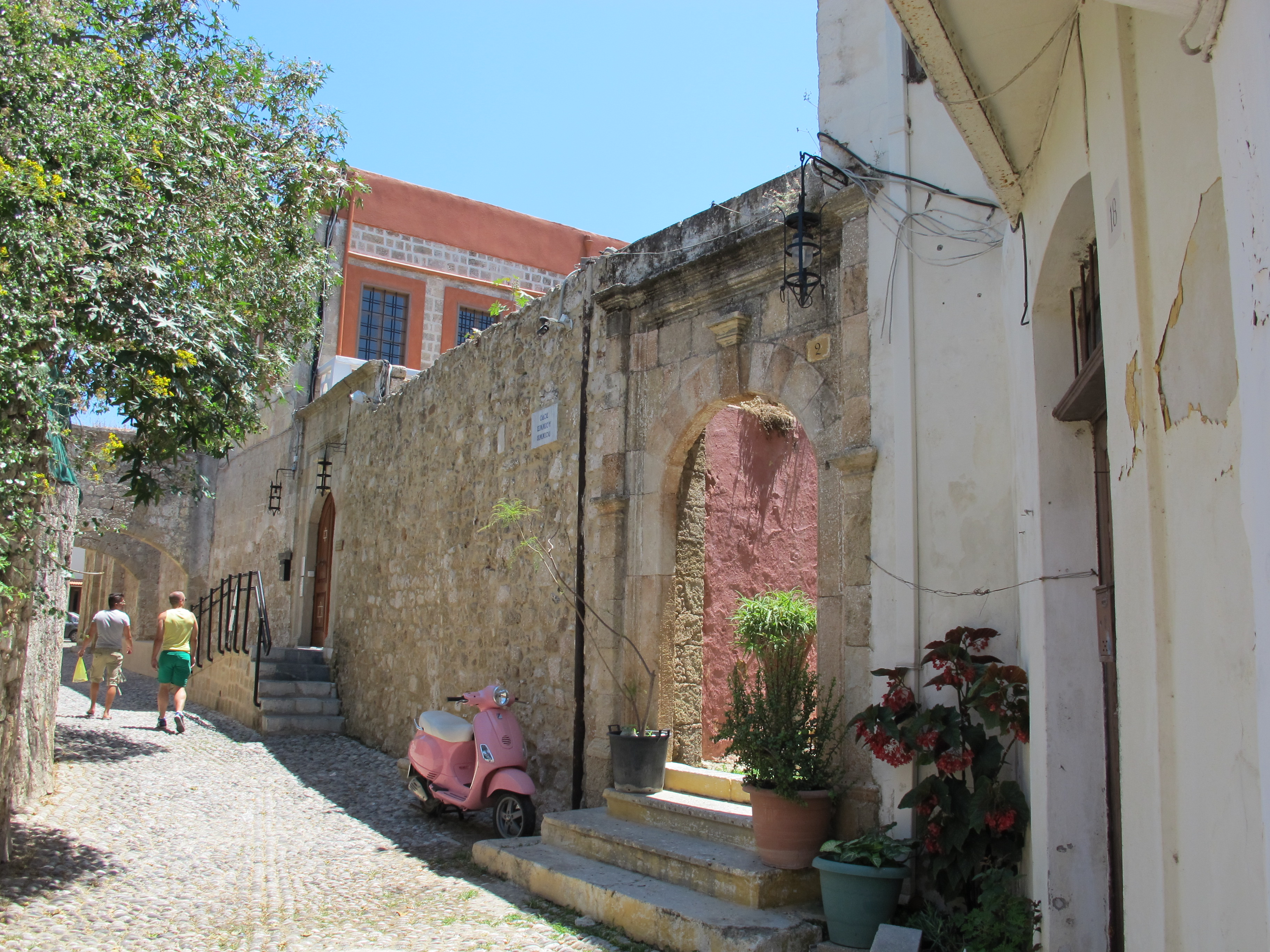
Entrance of Kahal Shalom Synagogue

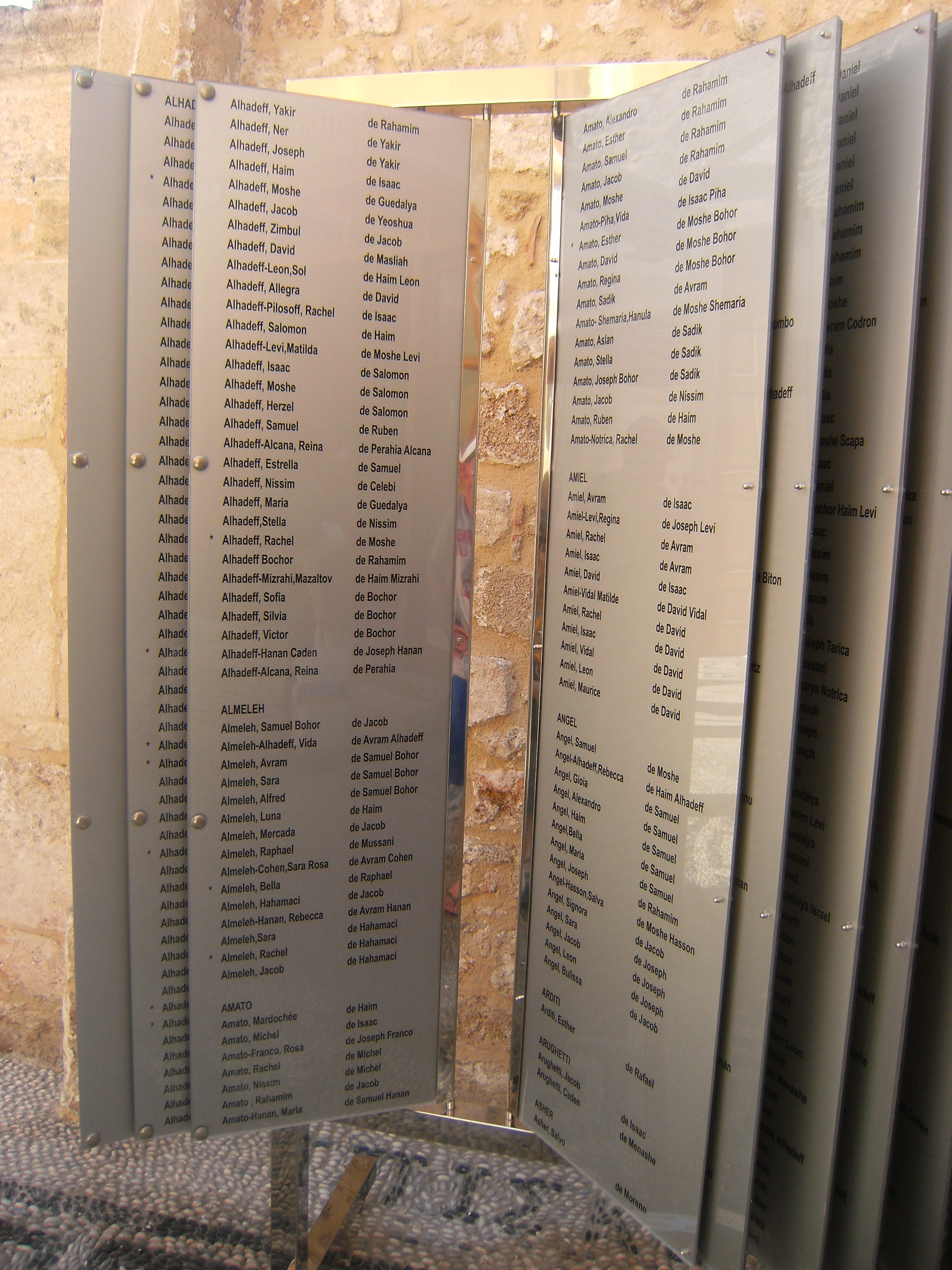
Plaque commemorating Holocaust victims from Rhodes, synagogue courtyard

== See also ==
- History of the Jews in Rhodes
- Judaism in Greece
- Jewish Museum of Rhodes
- Oldest synagogues in the world
