= Giambalvo =

Giambalvo is an Italian surname.

The name derives from Southern Italian variants on the names Gianni and Balbo.

== Notable people with the surname ==
- Carol Giambalvo, American anti-cult exit counselor
- Louis Giambalvo (born 1945), American character actor
- Valerio Giambalvo (born 1968), Italian swimmer
