= Azaru =

- Village
- Location within Azerbaijan
- Coordinates: 38°34′12″N 48°35′26″E
- Country: Azerbaijan
- Rayon: Astara
- Municipality: Asxanakəran
- Time zone: UTC+4 (AZT)

Azaru is a village in the Astara Rayon of Azerbaijan. The village forms part of the municipality of Asxanakəran.
