= Balbo (surname) =

Balbo is a surname of Italian origin. Notable people with the surname include:

- Abel Balbo (born 1966), Argentine football manager
- Cesare Balbo (1789–1853), Count of Vinadio, Italian writer and statesman
- Ennio Balbo (1922–1989), Italian film actor
- Giuseppe Balbo (1902–1980), Italian painter
- Italo Balbo (1896–1940), Italian Blackshirt leader, Italy's Marshal of the Air Force, Governor-General of Libya and Commander-in-Chief of Italian North Africa
- Julien Balbo (born 1979), French squash player
- Laura Balbo (1933–2026), Italian sociologist and politician
- Luis Balbo (born 2006), Venezuelan footballer
- Michael Balbo (15th century), Cretan rabbi and poet
- Ned Balbo (born 1959), American poet, translator and essayist
- Rosángela Balbó (1941–2011), Italian-born actress
- Susana Balbo (born 1956), Argentine enologist

== See also ==
- Giambalvo
