= Dəstor =

- Village
- Location within Azerbaijan
- Coordinates: 38°35′N 48°40′E
- Country: Azerbaijan
- Rayon: Astara
- Municipality: Asxanakəran
- Time zone: UTC+4 (AZT)
  - Summer (DST): UTC+5 (AZT)

Dəstor is a village in the municipality of Asxanakəran in the Astara Rayon of Azerbaijan.
