= Balbo's game =

Chess variant

	a	b	c	d	e	f	g	h	i	j	k
10	a10 w w	b10 w w	c10 w w	d10 w w	e10 black king	f10 black bishop	g10 black queen	h10 w w	i10 w w	j10 w w	k10 w w	10
9	a9 w w	b9 w w	c9 w w	d9 black rook	e9 black knight	f9 black bishop	g9 black knight	h9 black rook	i9 w w	j9 w w	k9 w w	9
8	a8 w w	b8 w w	c8 black pawn	d8 black pawn	e8 black pawn	f8 black pawn	g8 black pawn	h8 black pawn	i8 black pawn	j8 w w	k8 w w	8
7	a7 w w	b7	c7	d7	e7	f7	g7	h7	i7	j7	k7 w w	7
6	a6	b6	c6	d6	e6	f6	g6	h6	i6	j6	k6	6
5	a5	b5	c5	d5	e5	f5	g5	h5	i5	j5	k5	5
4	a4 w w	b4	c4	d4	e4	f4	g4	h4	i4	j4	k4 w w	4
3	a3 w w	b3 w w	c3 white pawn	d3 white pawn	e3 white pawn	f3 white pawn	g3 white pawn	h3 white pawn	i3 white pawn	j3 w w	k3 w w	3
2	a2 w w	b2 w w	c2 w w	d2 white rook	e2 white knight	f2 white bishop	g2 white knight	h2 white rook	i2 w w	j2 w w	k2 w w	2
1	a1 w w	b1 w w	c1 w w	d1 w w	e1 white king	f1 white bishop	g1 white queen	h1 w w	i1 w w	j1 w w	k1 w w	1
	a	b	c	d	e	f	g	h	i	j	k

Balbo's game board and starting setup

Balbo's game is a chess variant invented by M. [Monsieur] G. Balbo in 1974. The chessboard has a novel shape comprising 70 squares, and each player commands a full chess army minus one pawn.

The game was featured in Le Courrier des Echecs magazine, September 1974.

== Game rules ==
The starting setup is as shown. All the rules of chess apply, except there is no castling, and promotion squares are specially defined:

- At the end of the d- through h-files, pawns have normal promotion options.
- At the end of the c- and i-files, pawns may promote only to a bishop or knight.
- At the end of the outer four files, pawns may not promote.
