= Jewish Museum of Greece =

Coordinates: 37.9729°N 23.7332°E

Jewish Museum of Greece Εβραϊκό Μουσείο Ελλάδος
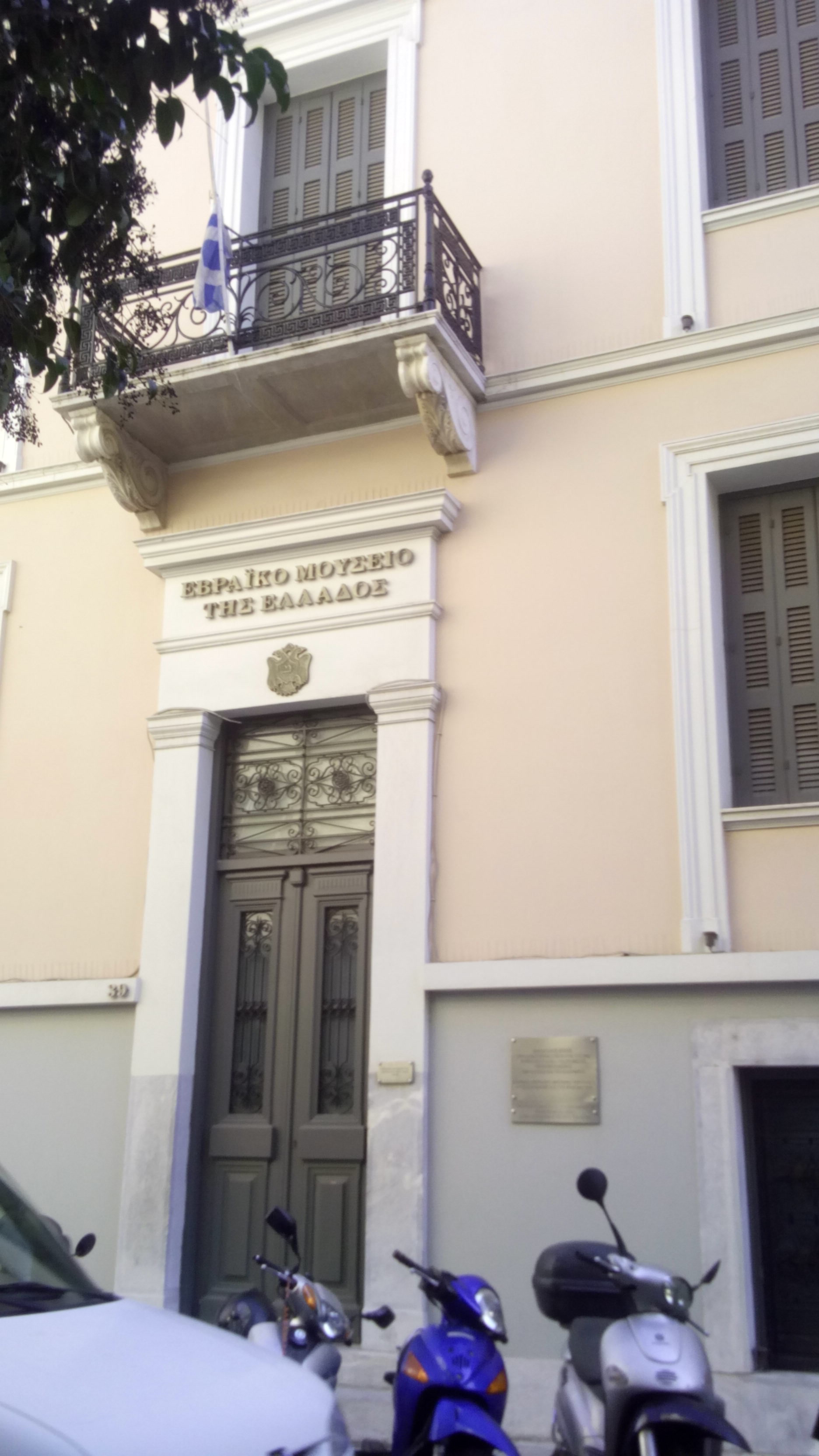
- The Jewish Museum of Greece
- Established: 1977
- Location: Nikis 39, Athens, Greece
- Type: Ethnological museum
- Public transit access: Syntagma; Line Syntagma
- Website: www.jewishmuseum.gr

The Jewish Museum of Greece (Greek: Εβραϊκό Μουσείο της Ελλάδος, romanized: Evraïkó Mouseío tīs Elládos) is a museum in Athens, Greece. It was established by Nicholas Stavroulakis in 1977 to preserve the material culture of the Greek Jews. The museum displays the 2,300 years of Greek Jewish history through the material artifacts in its possession. The collections and archives of the museum contain over 10,000 artifacts. Included in the museum is an art gallery, a periodic exhibition space, a research library, and photo archive and conservation laboratories.

== History ==
The Jewish Museum of Greece was established in 1977 as a permanent display for personal valuables of Greek Jewish victims of the Holocaust. It was originally located at a shared premises on Amalias Avenue in Athens. The collection at the museum gradually grew over the years and in 1989, the museum received the status of a legal non-profit entity from the Greek government. In 1998, the museum moved into a new separate building of their own. This was to be located in a 19th century house that was renovated to retain the facade but internally transform it into a four storey museum. Following the move, it was noted that the number of visitors to the museum had doubled by 2000.

The exhibits were originally of valuables belonging to Greek victims of the Holocaust but this later expanded to property that was stolen from Eastern Macedonia and Thrace by the Bulgarian occupation forces in Greece during the Second World War. This property was returned by the Bulgarian Communist authorities following the end of the war. It also started to make reference to early Jewish history in Greece around the 6th century BC.

== Gallery ==
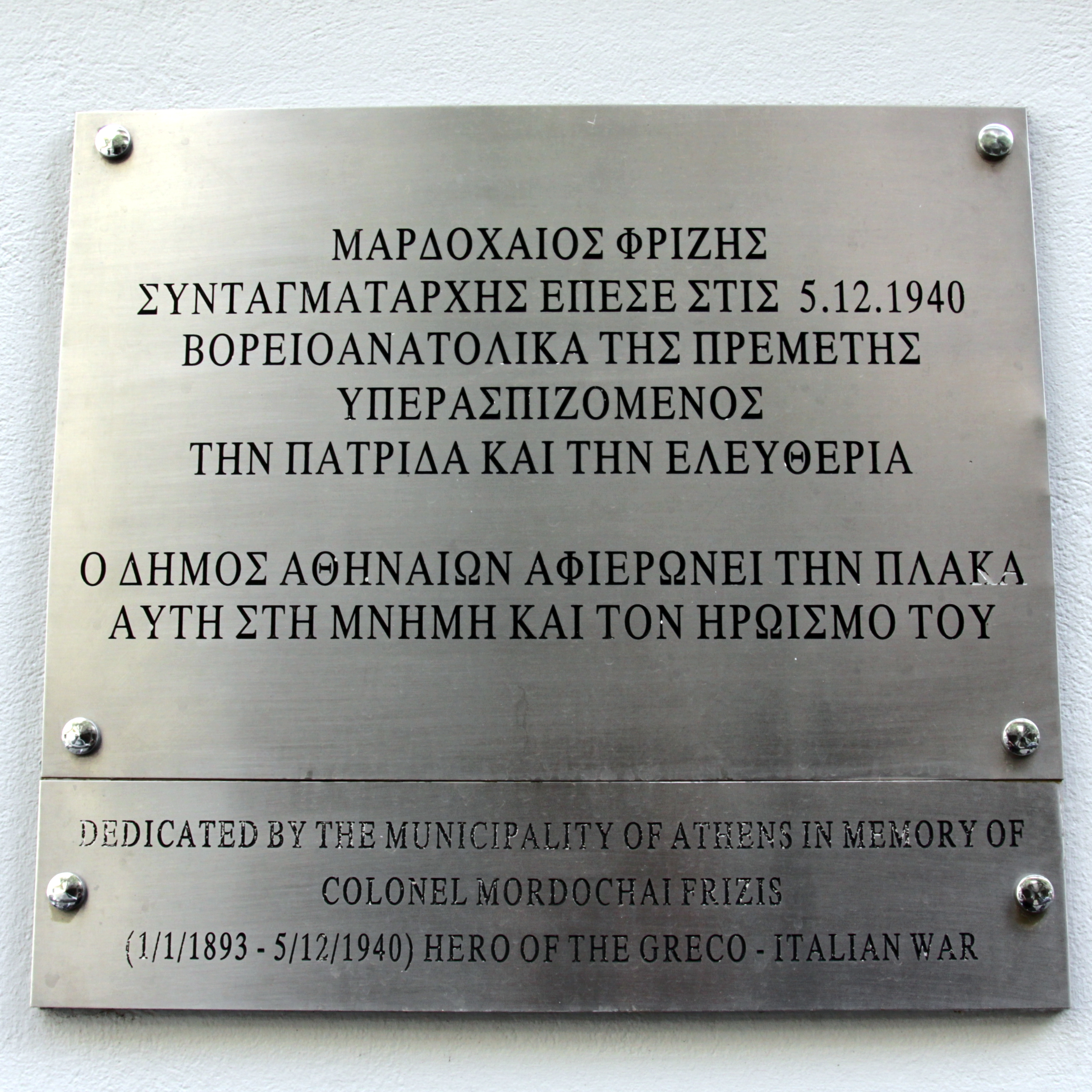
Plaque in memory of Mordechai Frizis at the Jewish Museum

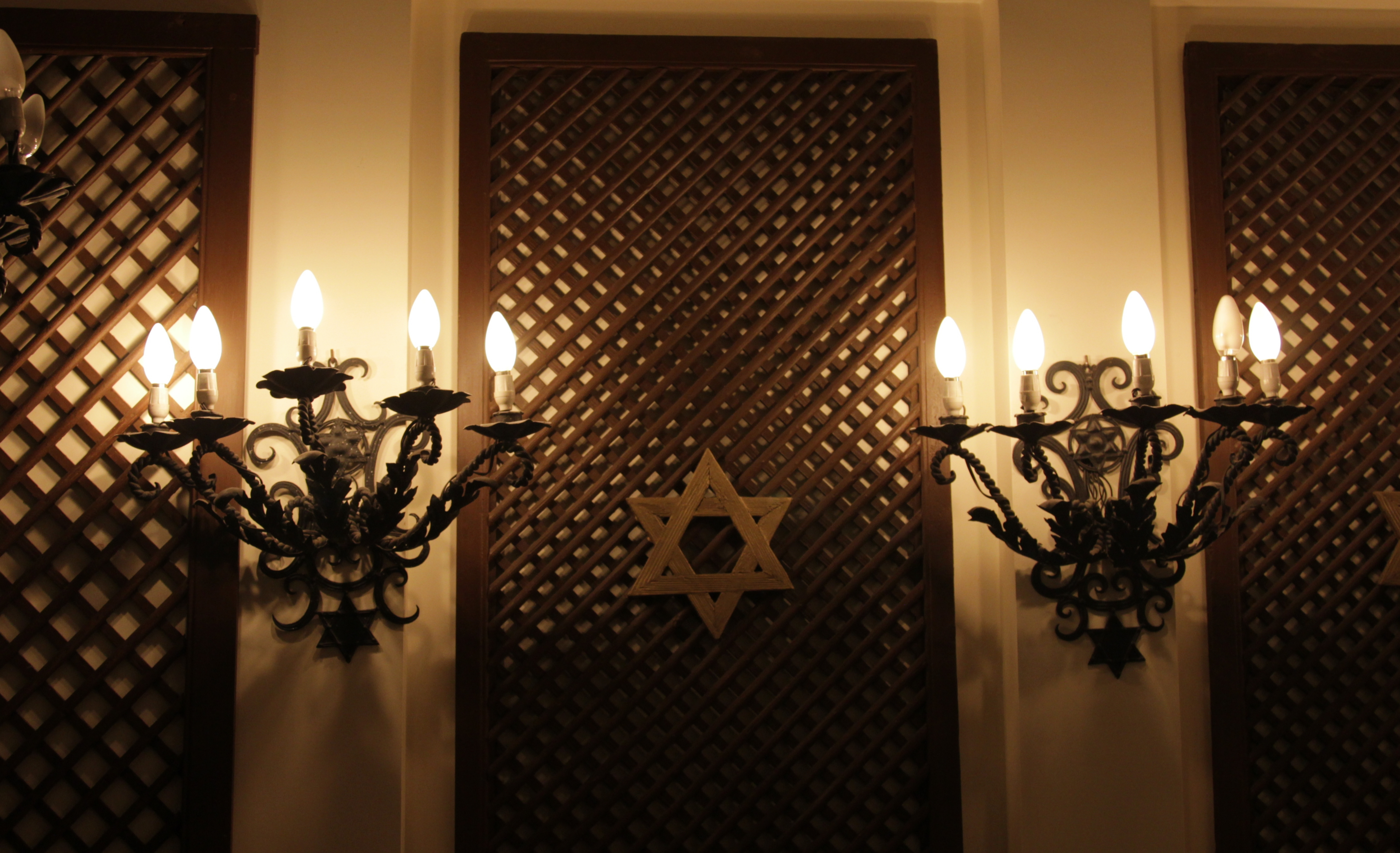
View of the interior

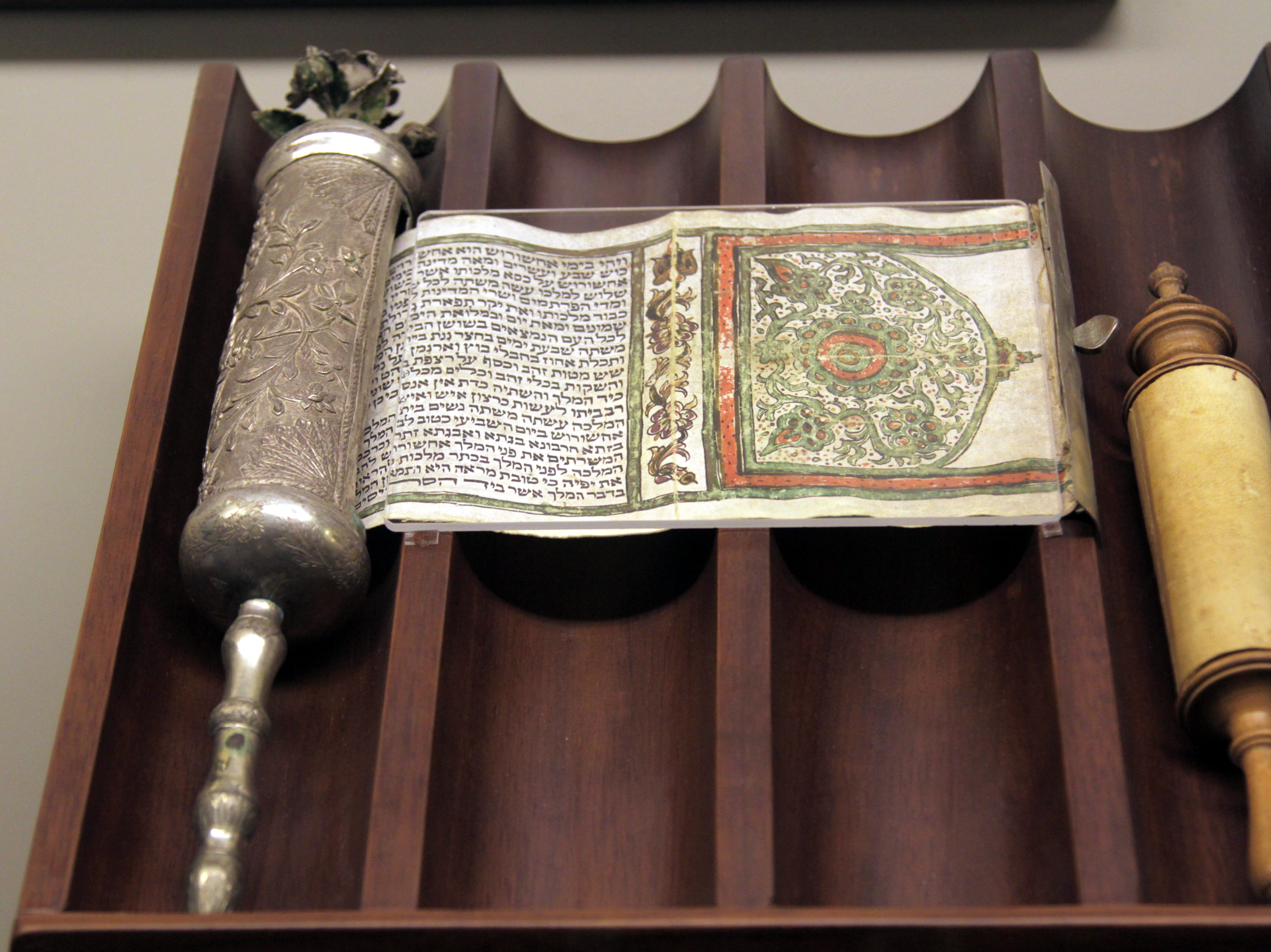
Megillah with cast and engraved silver-gilt case

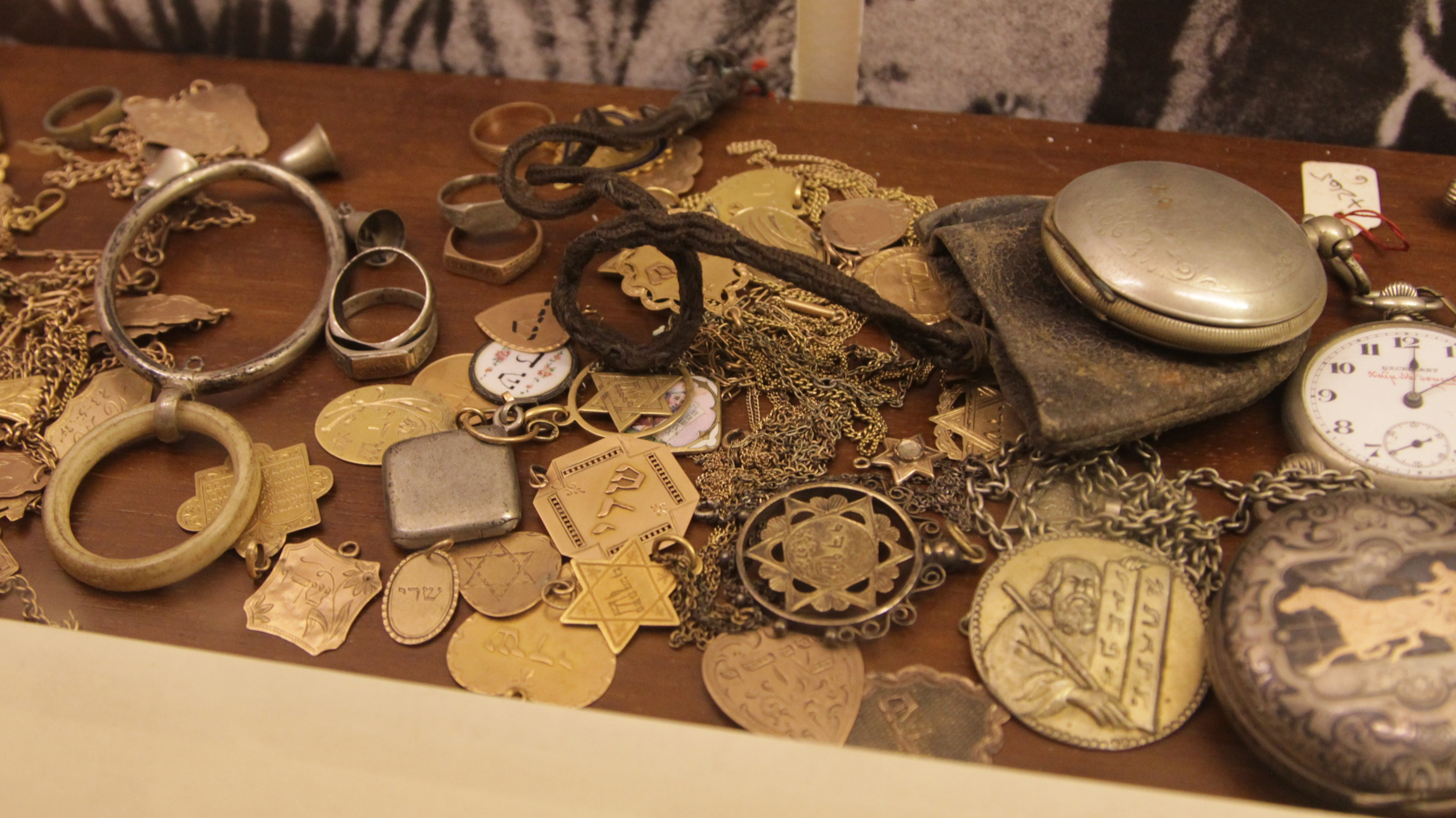
Artifacts that Nazis took from the local Jewish community

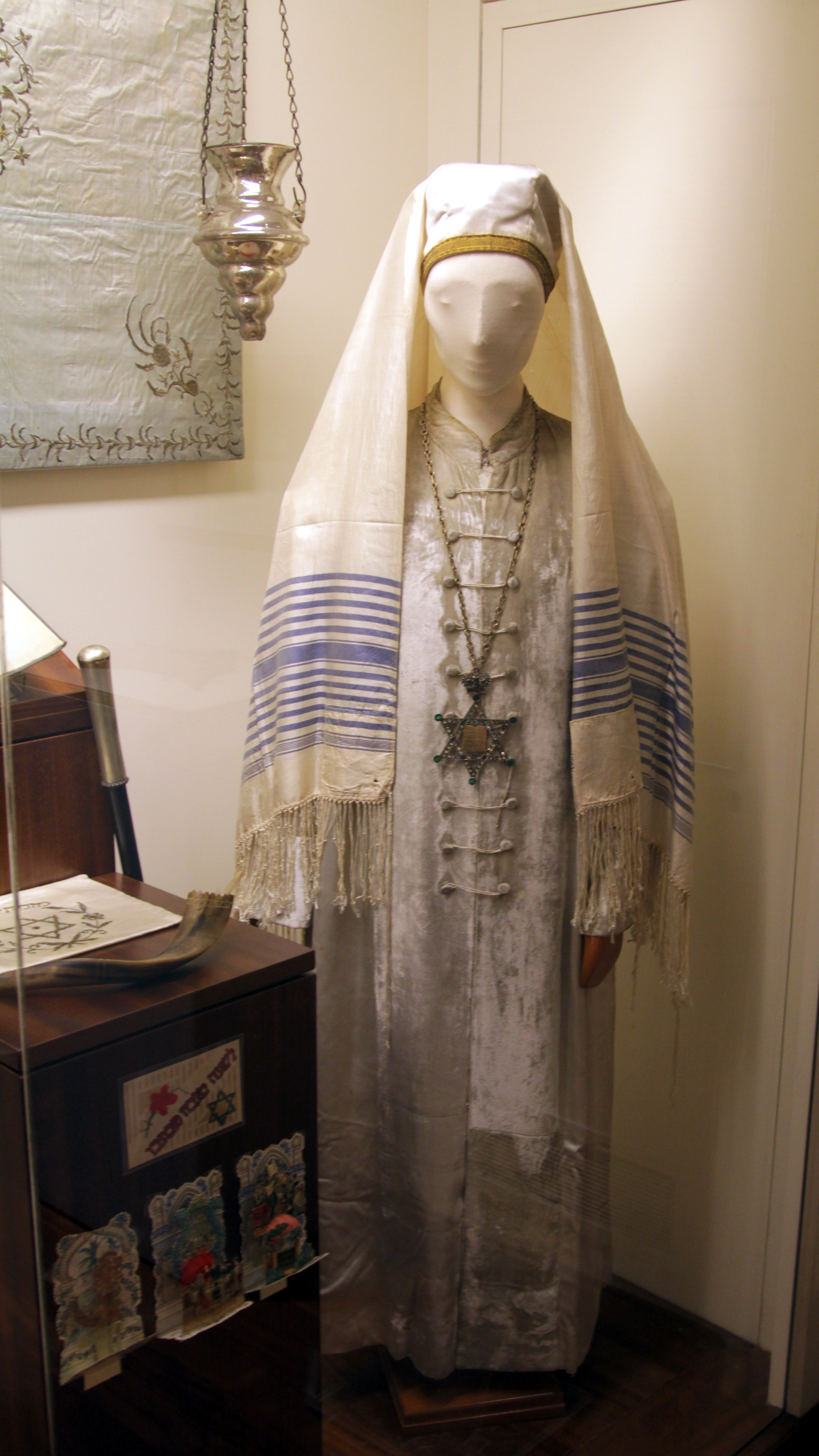
Traditional clothing

== See also ==
- Jewish Museum of Thessaloniki
- Jewish Museum of Rhodes
- History of the Jews in Greece
- Holocaust Museum of Greece
- Romaniote Jews
