= Balbau =

- Village
- Location within Azerbaijan
- Coordinates: 38°34′02″N 48°38′04″E
- Country: Azerbaijan
- Rayon: Astara
- Municipality: Asxanakəran
- Time zone: UTC+4 (AZT)
  - Summer (DST): UTC+5 (AZT)

Balbau (also, Bal’bo and Bol’bay) is a village in the Astara Rayon of Azerbaijan. The village forms part of the municipality of Asxanakəran.
