= Michael Balbo =

Personal life
- Born: Michael ben Shabbetai Cohen Balbo; 27 March 1411 Kingdom of Candia
- Died: After 1484

Religious life
- Religion: Judaism

Michael ben Shabbetai Cohen Balbo (Hebrew: מיכאל בן שבתאי כהן בלבו; 27 March 1411 – after 1484) was a Cretan rabbi, Kabbalist, and Hebrew poet. He came from a prominent rabbinic family, the son of Shabbetai ben Isaiah Balbo, who wrote works of philosophy, Kabbalah, and Biblical commentary.

A manuscript preserved in the Vatican Library contains several works of his, namely: a poem composed in 1453 on the occasion of the Fall of Constantinople and the cessation of the war; a poem lamenting his father's death (1456); a homiletic commentary on Psalm 28; and three sermons preached by Balbo in Khania in 1471, 1475, and 1477 respectively. Another manuscript contains an account of a disputation (vikuaḥ) between Balbo and Moses Ashkenazi on gilgul.

A work entitled Sha'are raḥamim, which is a supercommentary on Maimonides' commentary on the eleventh chapter of Sanhedrin, and a commentary on Ibn Ezra's hymn beginning Eḥad levado be-en samuk, both bear the name of Michael Cohen as author, who is supposed by Moritz Steinschneider to be identical with Balbo.
