= Jewish Museum of Rhodes =

Museum in Rhodes, Greece

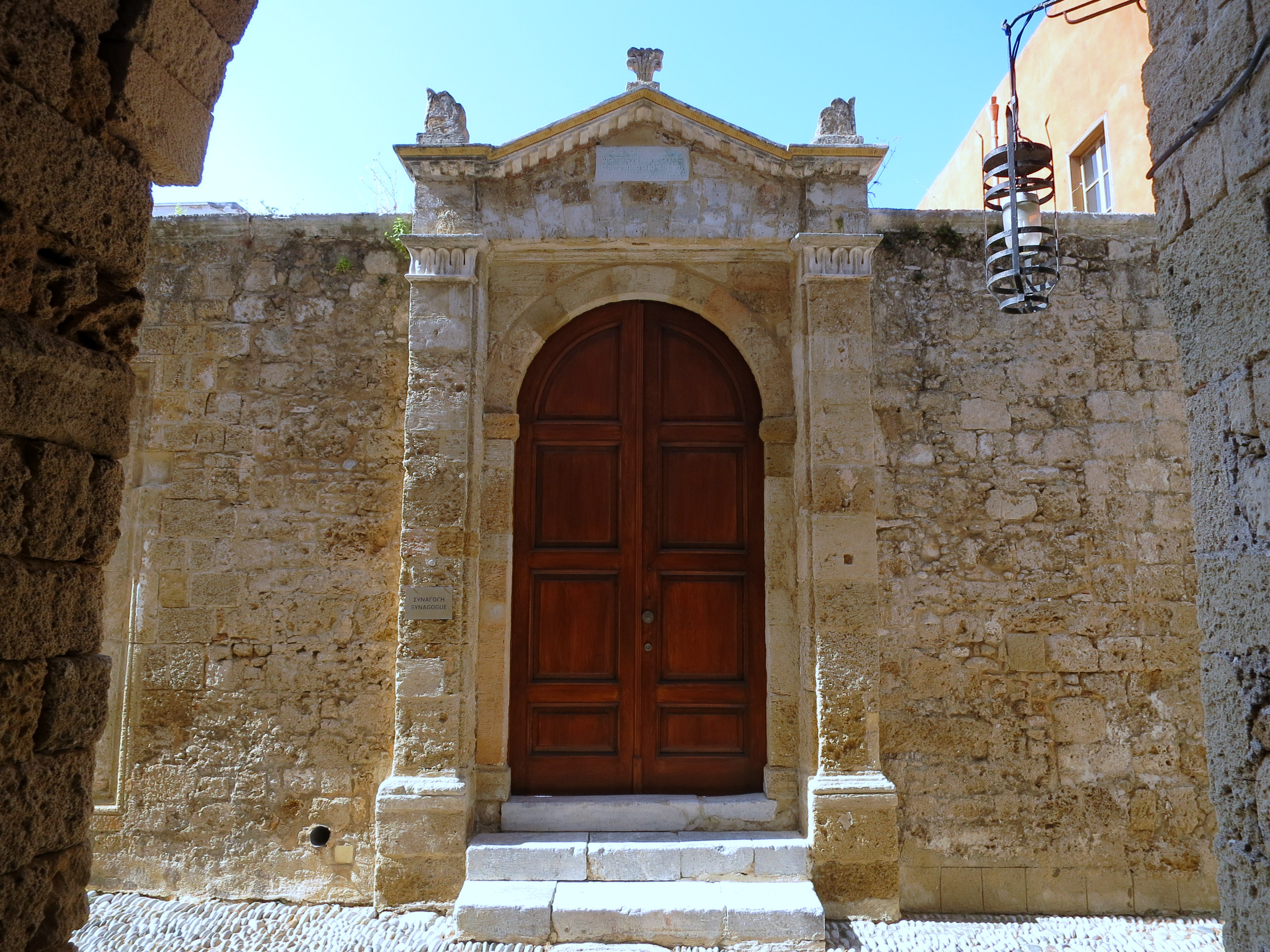
- Established: 1997
- Location: Greece
- Coordinates: 36°26′32″N 28°13′49″E
- Website: www.rhodesjewishmuseum.org
- Location of Jewish Museum of Rhodes

The Jewish Museum of Rhodes (Greek: Εβραϊκό Μουσείο της Ρόδου) is a museum located in the Old Town of the island of Rhodes, eastern Greece. It was established by Aron Hasson of the Rhodes Jewish Historical Foundation in 1997 to preserve the Jewish history and culture of Rhodes. It is adjacent to the Kahal Shalom Synagogue, which is the oldest synagogue in Greece and is located in six rooms formerly used as the women’s prayer rooms.

== See also ==
- History of the Jews in Greece
- Jewish Museum of Greece
- Jewish Museum of Thessaloniki
- History of the Jews of Thessaloniki
