= Colossus of Rhodes (disambiguation) =

The Colossus of Rhodes was a statue of the Greek Titan Helios, erected in the city of Rhodes between 292 and 280 BC.

Colossus of Rhodes may also refer to:

- The Colossus of Rhodes (Dalí), 1954 painting by Salvador Dalí
- The Colossus of Rhodes (film), 1961 Italian film
- The Colossus of Rhodes (novel), 2005 novel by Caroline Lawrence
- Colossus Rhodes BC, or Kolossos Rodou B.C., Greek professional basketball team

== See also ==
- The Rhodes Colossus, 1892 cartoon of the Scramble for Africa period
