= The Colossus of Rhodes (Dalí) =

1954 painting by Salvador Dalí

- El Coloso de Rodas (Spanish), Le Colosse de Rhodes (French)
- Artist: Salvador Dalí
- Year: 1954
- Medium: Oil on canvas
- Dimensions: 68.8 cm × 39 cm (27.1 in × 15.4 in)
- Location: Kunstmuseum Bern, Bern
- Accession: G 82.007

The Colossus of Rhodes is an oil painting on canvas by the Spanish surrealist artist Salvador Dalí, from 1954. It is one of a series of seven paintings he created for the 1956 film Seven Wonders of the World, each depicting one of the wonders. The work shows the Colossus of Rhodes, the ancient statue of the Greek titan-god of the sun, Helios. The painting was not used for the film and was donated to the Kunstmuseum Bern in 1981, where it remains.

Painted two decades after Dalí's heyday with the surrealist movement, the painting epitomises his shift from the avant-garde to the mainstream. Pressured by financial concerns after his move to the United States in 1940, and influenced by his fascination with Hollywood, Dalí shifted focus away from his earlier exploration of the subconscious and perception, and towards historical and scientific themes.

Dalí's rendering was influenced by a 1953 paper by Herbert Maryon, a sculptor and conservator at the British Museum. Maryon proposed that the historical Colossus was hollow, formed from hammered bronze plates, and located alongside the harbour rather than astride it. He further suggested that it used a hanging drapery to give the statue a stable tripod base. These elements were all incorporated by Dalí.

== Background ==
=== The Colossus ===
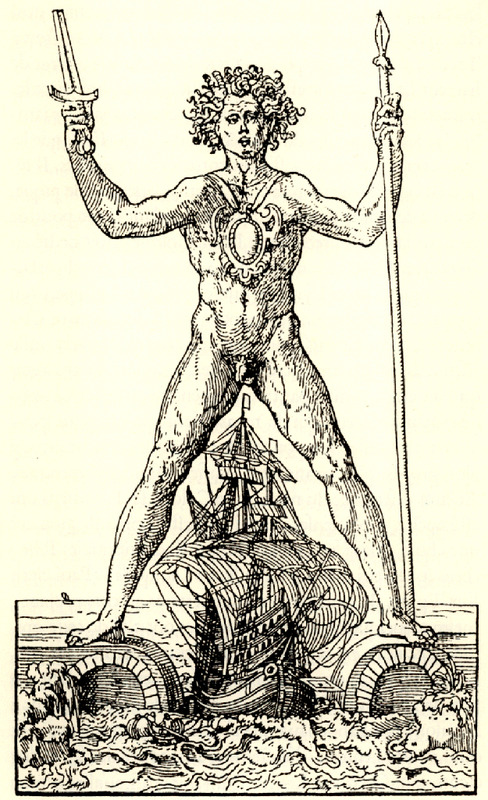
Sixteenth-century engraving by André Thevet imagining the Colossus astride the harbour and a galleon passing beneath

The Colossus of Rhodes was a monumental statue of the Greek sun god, Helios, that stood by the harbour of Rhodes for more than half a century in the third century BC. According to first-century BC historian Diodorus Siculus, it was constructed under the direction of Chares of Lindos to commemorate the city's victory over Demetrius Poliorcetes, who laid siege to Rhodes from 305 to 304 BC; Helios, patron saint of both the city and island of Rhodes, was chosen as the honoree. The statue stood until the 226 BC Rhodes earthquake, when, according to Pliny the Elder three centuries later in his Naturalis Historia, it buckled and fell. In his ninth-century AD Chronographia, Theophanes the Confessor wrote that its ruins remained until 652–53, when Muawiyah I conquered Rhodes and the Colossus was sold for scrap. Beginning with lists formed by Diodorus and other writers, the Colossus is recognized as one of the Seven Wonders of the Ancient World.

There are no extant contemporary depictions of the Colossus; the only evidence is textual, much of it summary and postdating the statue by centuries. Imagination has frequently filled in for documentation. Scientific attempts to re-envision the Colossus have persisted since the eighteenth century. In a presentation delivered in 1953, Herbert Maryon suggested that the statue was hollow, and stood aside the harbour rather than astride it. Made of hammered bronze plates less than 1/16-inch (1.6 mm) thick, Maryon said, the Colossus would have been supported on its base by a third point of support in the form of hanging drapery. Although Maryon's theory was not published until 1956, two years after Dalí's painting, newspaper articles about Maryon's 1953 presentation proliferated quickly and internationally, and his theory influenced Dalí.

=== Dalí and Hollywood ===
Dalí had a longstanding fascination with Hollywood films; he described the industry as a surrealist medium, and Walt Disney, Cecil B. DeMille and the Marx Brothers as "the three great American Surrealists". In his 1937 essay Surrealism in Hollywood, he wrote that "Nothing seems to me more suited to be devoured by the surrealist fire than those mysterious strips of 'hallucinatory celluloid' turned out so unconsciously in Hollywood, and in which we have already seen appear, stupefied, so many images of authentic delirium, chance and dream."

Dalí was commissioned to create artwork for the Seven Wonders of the World, a 1956 travelogue exploring natural and man-made wonders. He completed several paintings in 1954: The Colossus of Rhodes, The Pyramids, (Note: The Gala-Salvador Dalí Foundation catalogue raisonné and the Fundación AMYC, which holds the work, list The Pyramids as a 1957 work.) The Statue of Olympian Zeus, The Temple of Diana at Ephesus, The Walls of Babylon, and two versions of the same wonder, The Lighthouse of Alexandria and Lighthouse of Alexandria. In 1955 he produced a further version of The Walls of Babylon, and painted the last wonder, The Mausoleum at Halicarnassus. (Note: The Gala-Salvador Dalí Foundation catalogue raisonné does not list The Mausoleum at Halicarnassus. It sold in 2016 for $1,325,000 at Christie's, which asserted that "Nicolas and the late Robert Descharnes have confirmed the authenticity of this work.") The paintings were ultimately not used for the film.

== Description ==
The painting shows the Colossus of Rhodes standing on a base of unworked ashlar. The perspective is from below the statue's base, suggesting that the viewer is on a boat approaching the city, and emphasising the statue's extreme height and size. A piece of drapery wraps around the waist of Helios and hangs from his left arm, falling down to touch the ground behind him. Helios raises his right hand to shield his eyes from the sun over which he reigns, giving what the art historian Eric Shanes terms "a vaguely Surrealist touch" to Dalí's work. In the lower right Dalí signed and dated the work "Salvador Dalí / 1954".

== Themes ==
Dalí's most recognised works date from before 1940, when he was preoccupied with the subconscious and the nature of perception. The Persistence of Memory, the work with which he is most identified, was painted in 1931, and represented a decade that saw Dalí firmly within the avant-garde. His move to the United States in 1940 caused financial pressures, but brought to the fore his flair for showmanship, helping to develop his relationship with Hollywood. As World War II ended, Dalí's work turned towards the historical and religious, fused with aspects from modern culture and commercial art.

The Colossus of Rhodes exemplifies Dalí's preoccupations with cinema, history, and science, and his loosening grip on surrealism. It is only marginally surrealist—the god of the sun shields himself from his domain—and resembles a poster, befitting a work commissioned for a film. Dalí's Colossus resembles comic-book superheroes and, particularly in the preparatory version, the Statue of Liberty. Compared with Maryon's paper, writes the scholar Godefroid de Callataÿ, the painting "does not look extremely original". Dalí copied the likeness of the Colossus put forth by Maryon, clearly depicting hammered plates of bronze, and showing the same tripod structure of a figure supported by a piece of drapery.

== Provenance ==
The painting is in the collection of the Kunstmuseum Bern, as part of the 1981 Georges F. Keller bequest. It was exhibited at the Museo de Arte Moderno in Madrid during 1983, at the Staatsgalerie Stuttgart in 1989, at the Louisiana Museum of Modern Art in Humlebæk from 1989 to 1990, and later in 1990 at the Musée des Beaux-Arts, Montreal.

Several other paintings from Dalí's Seven Wonders of the World series have come up for sale. The Statue of Olympian Zeus was sold by Sotheby's in 2009 for $482,500, and is now in the collection of the Morohashi Museum of Modern Art. In 2013 Sotheby's sold The Temple of Diana at Ephesus for $845,000; it is now in a private collection. The Walls of Babylon was offered by Sotheby's in 2014 with an estimate of £300,000–400,000, but did not sell. Dalí's thematically similar 1955 paintings have been auctioned. Christie's sold The Mausoleum at Halicarnassus for $1,325,000 in 2016, and Walls of Babylon in 2001 for £168,750.

== Versions ==
First Version of The Colossus of Rhodes (1954)

Dalí created at least one preparatory study, First Version of The Colossus of Rhodes, a 1954 ink-on-cardboard work measuring 25 by 35.3 cm (9.8 by 13.9 in) that includes three sketches of the Colossus. It was displayed at the Time Warner Center in New York from 3 November 2010 to 30 April 2011 as part of the exhibition Dalí at Time Warner Center: The Vision of a Genius, where it was also for sale.

Lithographs replicating the statue are frequently offered for sale. Owing to what Shanes calls Dalí's "exploitative and/or lackadaisical attitude", the trade in Dalí's lithographs is "in chaos". Dalí, eschewing the custom of limited printings with plates that were then destroyed, signed some 40,000 to 350,000 blank sheets of paper, which were then printed with his works. Coupled with rampant forgeries of an easily faked signature, this—termed by Shanes "one of the largest and most prolonged acts of financial fraud ever perpetrated in the history of art"—caused the lithographs to become virtually worthless.

== See also ==
- List of works by Salvador Dalí

== Bibliography ==
- Badoud, Nathan (January 2012). "L'image du Colosse de Rhodes". Monuments et Mémoires de la Fondation Eugène Piot (in French). 91: 5–40. doi:10.3406/piot.2012.1738.
- Beristain, Ana & Descharnes, Robert (1983). 400 Obras de Salvador Dalí de 1914 a 1983: Exposición Realizada Conjuntamente por el Ministerio de Cultura y la Generalitat de Catalunya en homenaje a Salvador Dalí (in Spanish). Madrid: Ministerio de Cultura. ISBN 84-500-8720-1.
- "The Colossus of Rhodes". Catalogue Raisonné of Paintings by Salvador Dalí. Gala-Salvador Dalí Foundation.
- de Callataÿ, Godefroid (2006). "The Colossus of Rhodes: Ancient Texts and Modern Representations". In Ligota, Christopher R. & Quantin, Jean-Louis (eds.). History of Scholarship: A Selection of Papers from the Seminar on the History of Scholarship Held Annually at the Warburg Institute. London: Oxford University Press. pp. 39–73. ISBN 978-0-19-928431-3.
- Easby, Dudley T. Jr. (July 1966). "Necrology". American Journal of Archaeology. 70 (3). Archaeological Institute of America: 287. doi:10.1086/AJS501899. JSTOR 501899. S2CID 245268774.
- "Fine Works Featured in Auction Scheduled at Capital Fine Art". Advertising Supplement. Los Angeles Times. Los Angeles, California. 12 April 1985. p. 2 – via Newspapers.com.
- King, Elliot H. (2007). Dalí, Surrealism and Cinema. Harpenden: Kamera Books. ISBN 978-1-904048-90-9.
- Bryant, Marsha & Eaverly, Mary Ann (2019). "Modernist Migrations, Pedagogical Arenas: Translating Modernist Reception in the Classroom and Gallery". In Kozak, Lynn & Hickman, Miranda (eds.). The Classics in Modernist Translation. London: Bloomsbury Academic. pp. 189–200. ISBN 978-1-3500-4095-3.
- "The Lighthouse of Alexandria". Catalogue Raisonné of Paintings by Salvador Dalí. Gala-Salvador Dalí Foundation.
- "Lighthouse of Alexandria". Catalogue Raisonné of Paintings by Salvador Dalí. Gala-Salvador Dalí Foundation.
- Maryon, Herbert (September 1947). "The Sutton Hoo Helmet". Antiquity. XXI (83): 137–144. doi:10.1017/S0003598X00016598. S2CID 163948719.
- Maryon, Herbert (1956). "The Colossus of Rhodes". The Journal of Hellenic Studies. LXXVI: 68–86. doi:10.2307/629554. JSTOR 629554. S2CID 162892604.
- "The Pyramids". Catalogue Raisonné of Paintings by Salvador Dalí. Gala-Salvador Dalí Foundation.
- Sabater y Bonany, Enrique (2010). Dalí at Time Warner Center: The Vision of a Genius. New York: Galerie Elysses. OCLC 794730258.
- "Salvador Dali (1904–1989): Le mausolée d'Halicarnasse". Christie's. 2016.
- "Salvador Dali (1904–1989): The Walls of Babylon". Christie's. 2001.
- "Salvador Dalí: Les Murs de Babylone". Sotheby's. 2014.
- "Salvador Dalí: Giza Pyramids 1957". Fundación AMYC. Archived from the original on 30 December 2019.
- "Salvador Dalí: Statue de Zeus Olympien". Sotheby's. 2009.
- "Salvador Dalí: Temple de Diana à Epheseus". Sotheby's. 2013.
- Shanes, Eric (2012). The Life and Masterworks of Salvador Dalí. New York: Parkstone International. ISBN 978-1-78042-879-6.
- "The Statue of Olympian Zeus". Catalogue Raisonné of Paintings by Salvador Dalí. Gala-Salvador Dalí Foundation.
- "The Temple of Diana at Ephesus". Catalogue Raisonné of Paintings by Salvador Dalí. Gala-Salvador Dalí Foundation.
- "The Walls of Babylon". Catalogue Raisonné of Paintings by Salvador Dalí. Gala-Salvador Dalí Foundation.
- "Walls of Babylon". Catalogue Raisonné of Paintings by Salvador Dalí. Gala-Salvador Dalí Foundation.
