= Rhodes Phoenician-Greek bilingual inscriptions =

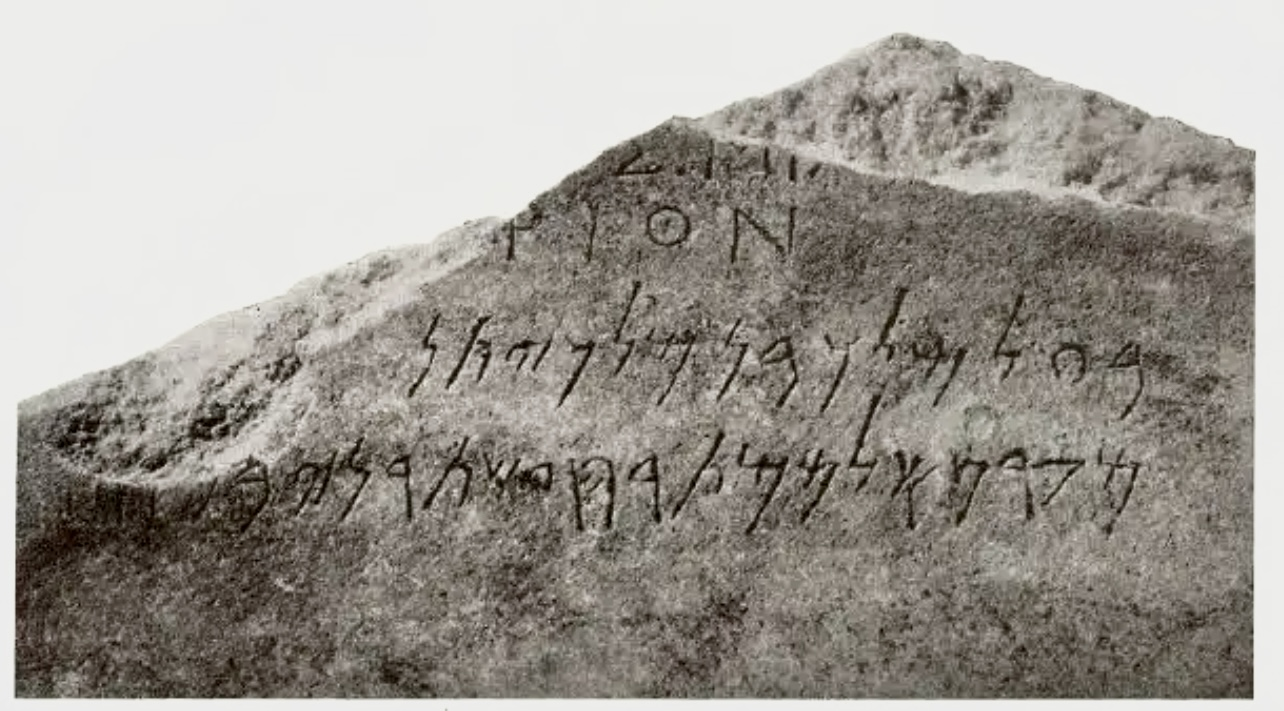
The first inscription (KAI 44)

The Rhodes Phoenician-Greek bilingual inscriptions are three short bilingual inscriptions found between 1914 and 1968 in Rhodes.

All three inscriptions have been suggested to be from Cypriot-Phoenician emigrants to Rhodes, and have been compared to the Athenian Greek-Phoenician inscriptions. However, two out of the three inscriptions record grandfather who had non-Cypriot names.

== First inscription (KAI 44) ==
White marble block discovered in 1914–15, south of Monte Smith along the road to the suburb of Mangavli on the edge of the subterranean valley of Sandurli, by Amedeo Maiuri and John Myres.

Currently in the courtyard of the Archaeological Museum of Rhodes.

- Greek inscription: ...ς Μυλ. ι...
- Phoenician inscription: B‘LMLK BN MLKYTN MQM ‘LM MTRH ’ŠTRNY BN...
- Phoenician inscription: Baal-melek, son of Milkyaton, the raiser of the gods, espoused of Astronoë, son of...

Dated to the late second century BCE.

It is known as KAI 44 and Gibson III 39.

== Second inscription (KAI 45) ==
Small white marble fragment, thought to have been an ex voto statuette, discovered in 1939 by M. Segre on Monte Smith, near the Temple of Pythian Apollo. Currently in the Archaeological Museum of Rhodes. The Phoenician inscriptions is a Phoenician votive inscription.

- Greek inscription: ...ις
- Phoenician inscription: ’Š NDR TRT... ...MN BN B‘LYTN BN...
- Phoenician translation: "This is what has vowed by TRT-... ...[Esh?]-mun, son of Baalyaton, son of..."

The name Trrt... corresponds to no known Phoenician name. Della Vida proposed it as Egyptian, and Fraser noted that Egyptian proper names are known to occur in Cypriot inscriptions on Rhodes.

== Third inscription ==
Tombstone discovered in 1968 in area of eastern necropolis near the church, a plaque of dark grey marble plaque, complete on all sides.

Currently in the Archaeological Museum of Rhodes with ID number TIBE 1233.

The inscription has been dated to c.200 BCE.

- Greek inscription: Ἡρακλείδης Κῐτῐεύς
- Greek translation: Heraclides of Citium
- Phoenician inscription: L‘BDMLQRT BN ‘BDSSM BN TGNŠ
- Phoenician translation: "For 'Abd-Melqart, son of 'Abd-sasom, son of TGNŠ"

== Bibliography ==
- Vida, G. Levi Della (1940). "A Phoenician Fragment from Rhodes". Journal of the American Oriental Society. 60 (2). JSTOR: 260–264. doi:10.2307/594013. ISSN 0003-0279. JSTOR 594013.
- Fraser, P. M. (1970). "Greek-Phoenician Bilingual Inscriptions from Rhodes". The Annual of the British School at Athens. 65. [British School at Athens, Cambridge University Press]: 31–36. doi:10.1017/S0068245400014672. ISSN 0068-2454. JSTOR 30103207. S2CID 161972095.
- Maiuri, Amadeo. Un'Iscrizione Greco-Fenicia A Rodi, 1916
