= Seven Wonders of the World (film) =

1956 American documentary film

- Directed by: Tay Garnett; Paul Mantz; Andrew Marton; Ted Tetzlaff; Walter Thompson
- Written by: Prosper Buranelli; W. P. Lipscomb
- Produced by: Merian C. Cooper; Lowell Thomas
- Starring: Lowell Thomas; Paul Mantz
- Cinematography: Harry Squire
- Edited by: Harvey Manger; Jack Murray
- Music by: Jerome Moross; Emil Newman; David Raksin; Sol Kaplan (uncredited)
- Distributed by: Cinerama Releasing Corporation
- Release date: April 10, 1956
- Running time: 106 minutes
- Country: United States
- Language: English
- Box office: $6.5 million (US/Canada)

Seven Wonders of the World is a 1956 documentary film in Cinerama. Lowell Thomas searches the world for natural and man-made wonders and invites the audience to try to update the ancient Greek list of the "Wonders of the World".

== Cast ==
- Lowell Thomas as himself
- Paul Mantz as himself
- Claude Dauphin as Narrator (French version) / Récitant (voice)

== Production ==
Merian C. Cooper started Seven Wonders of the World as the second Cinerama film after 1952's This Is Cinerama. By September 1953, $1 million had already been spent and it was estimated that it would cost a further $1 million to complete.

Stanley Warner Corp. acquired the rights to the film (and all Cinerama product) during production.

Cinerama Holiday, which started production later, was released before Seven Wonders of the World, which then became the third Cinerama film to be released.

== Reception ==
By January 1958, the film grossed $6.5 million in the United States and Canada. It spent more than 14 months on release at the Casino Theatre in Buenos Aires, a record run in Argentina.

== See also ==
- List of American films of 1956
- The Colossus of Rhodes
