= Chares of Lindos =

Greek sculptor

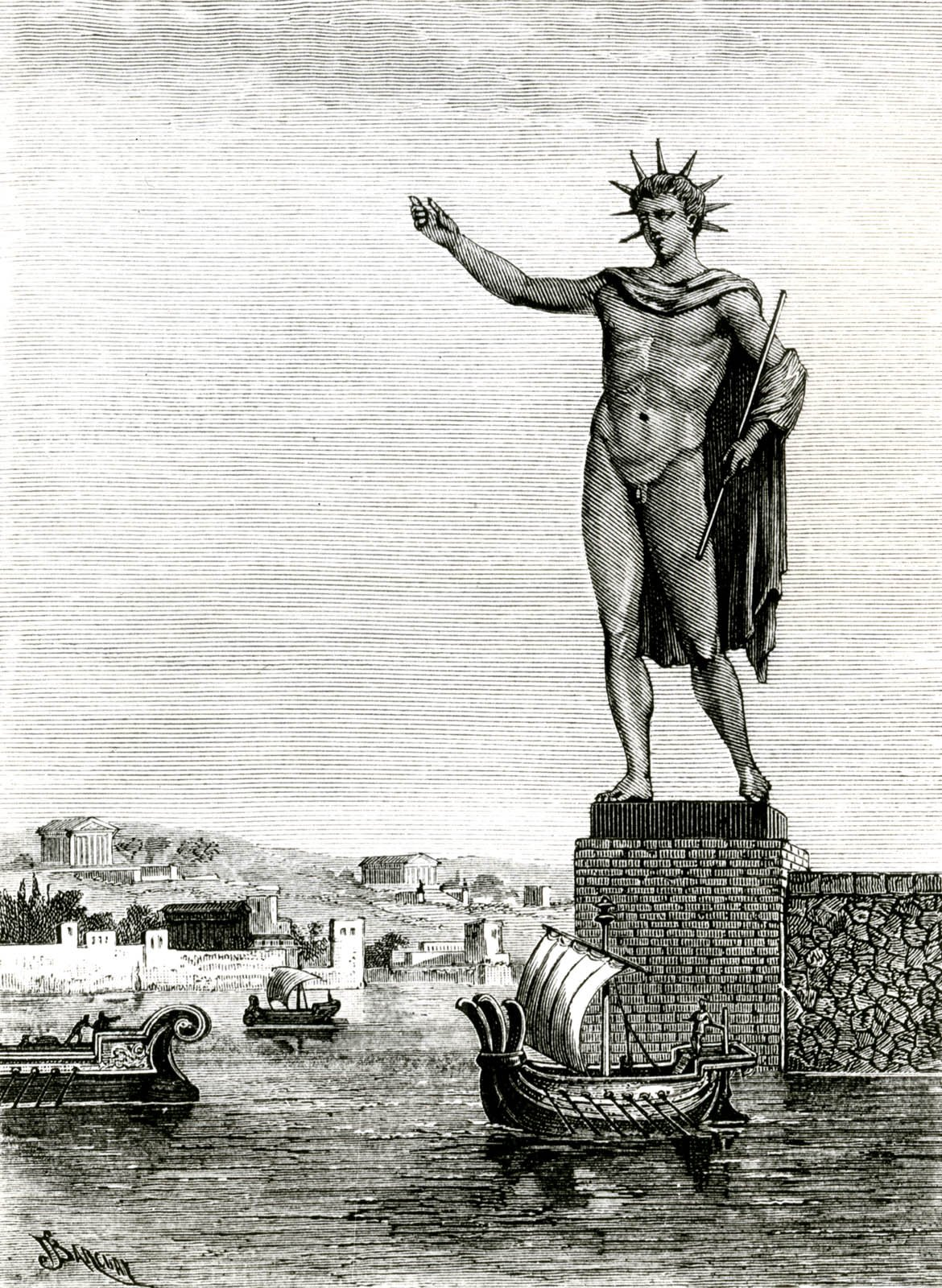
- 19th-century artistic impression of the Colossus of Rhodes, created by Chares of Lindos
- Born: before 305 BC; Lindos, Greece
- Died: c. 280 BC; Rhodes, Greece
- Occupation: sculptor
- Years active: ?-c.280 BC
- Notable work: Colossus of Rhodes

Chares of Lindos (/ˈkɛəriːz/; Ancient Greek: Χάρης ὁ Λίνδιος, gen.: Χάρητος; before 305 BC – c.280 BC) was a Greek sculptor born on the island of Rhodes. He was a pupil of Lysippos. Chares constructed the Colossus of Rhodes in 282 BC, an enormous bronze statue of the sun god Helios and the patron god of Rhodes. The statue was built to commemorate Rhodes' victory over the invading Macedonians in 305 BC, led by Demetrius I, son of Antigonus, a general under Alexander the Great. Also attributed to Chares was a colossal head that was brought to Rome and dedicated by P. Lentulus Spinther on the Capitoline Hill in 57 BC (Pliny, Natural History XXXIV.18).

The Colossus of Rhodes is one of the Seven Wonders of the Ancient World, and was considered Chares's greatest accomplishment, until its destruction in an earthquake in 226 BC.

The work may have been completed by Laches, also an inhabitant of Lindos.

== In popular culture ==
- L. Sprague de Camp's novel The Bronze God of Rhodes is written as Chares' memoirs of the Siege of Rhodes and the building of the Colossus of Rhodes.
- Asteroid 236746 Chareslindos, discovered by Vincenzo Casulli in 2007, was named after the ancient Greek sculptor. The official naming citation was published by the Minor Planet Center on 4 November 2017 (M.P.C. 107121).
- Chares, called by the Italian version of his name (Carete), appears in the 1961 film The Colossus of Rhodes, portrayed by Félix Fernández.
