= Colossus of Rhodes =

Statue of the Greek god Helios

Coordinates: 36°27′04″N 28°13′40″E

- ὁ Κολοσσὸς Ῥόδιος (Ancient Greek)
- Interactive map of Colossus of Rhodes
- Location: Rhodes, Greece

History
- Built: c. 292–280 BC
- Built by: Chares of Lindos
- Demolished: 226 BC (Toppled by an earthquake)

Site notes
- Material: Bronze, iron, stone
- Condition: Completely destroyed; no verified archaeological remains exist in situ.

UNESCO World Heritage Site
- Criteria: ii, iv, v
- Designated: 1988
- Part of: Medieval City of Rhodes
- Reference no.: 493

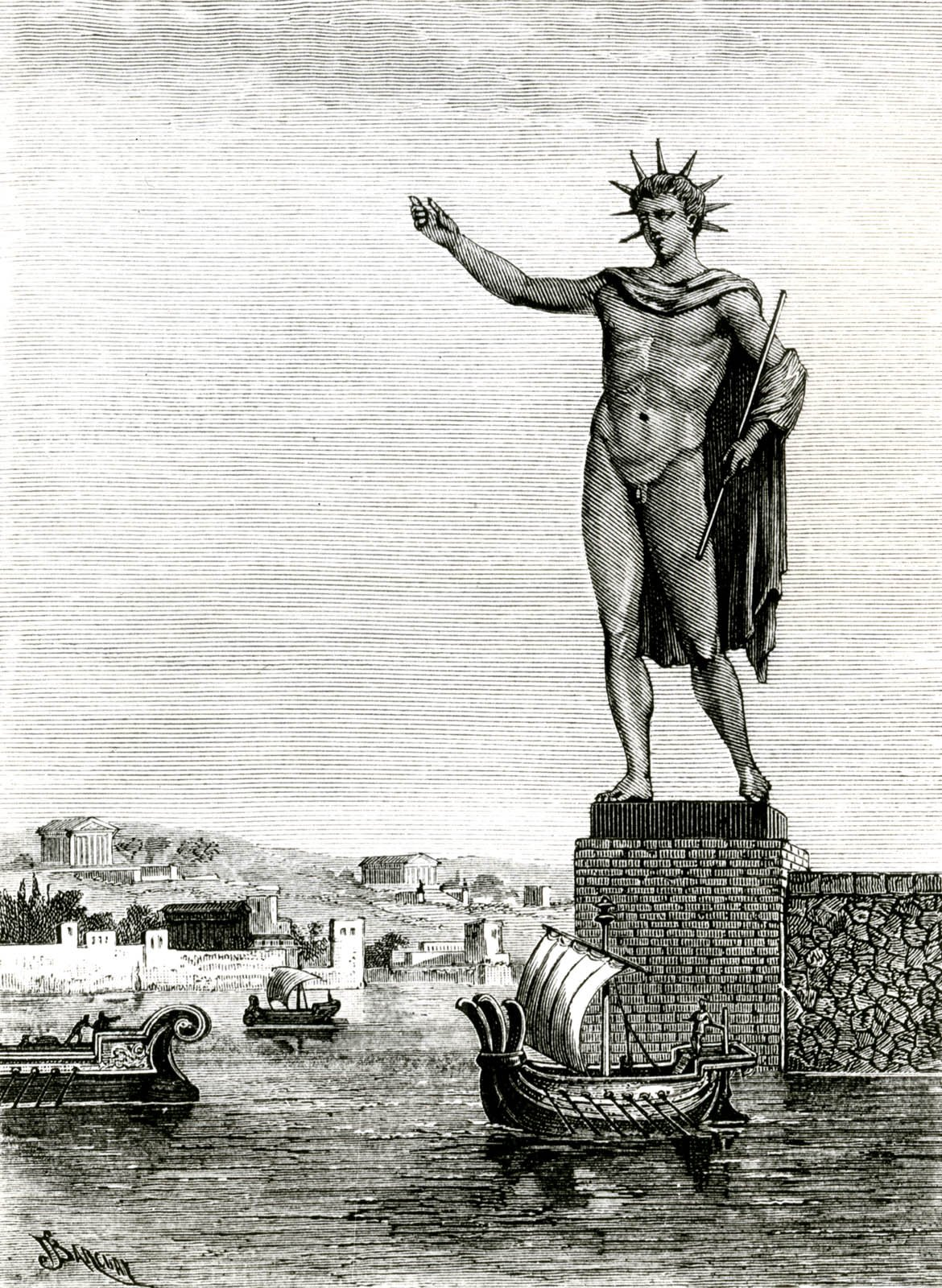
Colossus of Rhodes, artist's conception, 1880

The Colossus of Rhodes (Note: (Ancient Greek: ὁ Κολοσσὸς Ῥόδιος, romanized: ho Kolossòs Rhódios; Modern Greek: Κολοσσός της Ρόδου, romanized: Kolossós tis Ródou) Kolossos means "giant statue". Robert S. P. Beekes has suggested a Pre-Greek proto-form *kolok^{y}-./>) was a statue of the Greek sun god Helios, erected in the city of Rhodes, on the Greek island of the same name, by Chares of Lindos in 280 BC. One of the Seven Wonders of the Ancient World, it was constructed to celebrate the successful defence of Rhodes against an attack by Demetrius I of Macedon, who had besieged it for a year with a large army and navy.

According to most contemporary descriptions, the Colossus stood approximately 70 cubits, or 33 metres (108 feet) high—‌approximately two-thirds of the height of the modern Statue of Liberty from feet to crown—‌making it the tallest statue in the ancient world. It collapsed during the earthquake of 226 BC, although parts of it were preserved. In accordance with the Oracle of Delphi, the Rhodians did not rebuild it. John Malalas wrote that Hadrian in his reign re-erected the Colossus, but he was mistaken. According to the Suda, the Rhodians were called Colossaeans (Κολοσσαεῖς), because they erected the statue on the island.

Since 2008, a series of proposals to build a new Colossus at Rhodes Harbour have been announced, although the actual location of the original monument remains in dispute.

== Siege of Rhodes ==
In the late fourth century BC, Rhodes, allied with Ptolemy I of Egypt, prevented a mass invasion staged by their common enemy, Antigonus I Monophthalmus.

In 304 BC, a relief force of ships sent by Ptolemy arrived, and Demetrius I of Macedon (son of Antigonus) and his army abandoned the siege, leaving behind most of their siege equipment. To celebrate their victory, the Rhodians sold the equipment left behind for 300 talents and decided to use the money to build a colossal statue of their patron god, Helios. Construction was left to the direction of Chares, a native of Lindos in Rhodes, who had been involved with large-scale statues before. His teacher, the sculptor Lysippos, had constructed a 22-metre-high (72-foot) (Note: Forty cubits high, according to Pliny.) bronze statue of Zeus at Tarentum.

== Construction ==
Timeline and map of the Seven Wonders of the Ancient World, including the Colossus of Rhodes

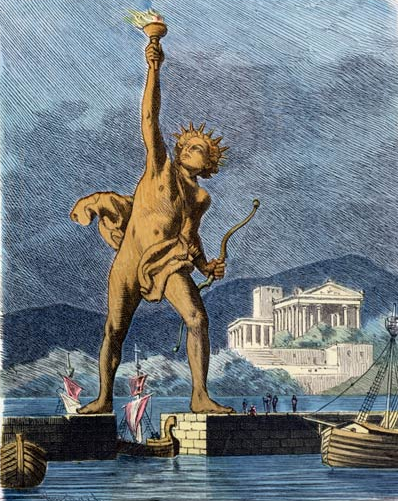
The Colossus of Rhodes as imagined by Ferdinand Knab, 1886

Construction began in 292 BC. Ancient accounts, which differ to some degree, describe the structure as being built with iron tie bars to which bronze plates were fixed to form the skin. The interior of the structure, which stood on a 15-metre-high (49-foot) white marble pedestal near the Rhodes harbour entrance, was then filled with stone blocks as construction progressed. Other sources place the Colossus on a breakwater in the harbour. According to most contemporary descriptions, the statue itself was about 70 cubits, or 32 metres (105 feet) tall. Much of the iron and bronze was reforged from the various weapons Demetrius's army left behind, and the abandoned second siege tower may have been used for scaffolding around the lower levels during construction.

Philo of Byzantium wrote in De septem mundi miraculis that Chares created the sculpture in situ by casting it in horizontal courses and then placing "...a huge mound of earth around each section as soon as it was completed, thus burying the finished work under the accumulated earth, and carrying out the casting of the next part on the level."

Modern engineers have put forward a hypothesis for the statue's construction (based on the technology of the time), and the accounts of Philo and Pliny, who saw and described the ruins.

The base pedestal was said to be at least 18 metres (59 feet) in diameter, and either circular or octagonal. The feet were carved in stone and covered with thin bronze plates riveted together. Eight forged iron bars set in a radiating horizontal position formed the ankles and turned up to follow the lines of the legs while becoming progressively smaller. Individually cast curved bronze plates 1.5 metres (60 in) square with turned-in edges were joined by rivets through holes formed during casting to form a series of rings. The lower plates were 25 millimetres (1 in) in thickness to the knee and 20 millimetres (3/4 in) thick from knee to abdomen, while the upper plates were 6.5 to 12.5 millimetres (1/4 to 1/2 in) thick except where additional strength was required at joints such as the shoulder, neck, etc.

Archaeologist Ursula Vedder has proposed that the sculpture was cast in large sections following traditional Greek methods and that Philo's account is "not compatible with the situation proved by archaeology in ancient Greece."

After twelve years, in 280 BC, the statue was completed. Greek anthologies of poetry have preserved what is believed to be the dedication text on the Colossus.

Αὐτῷ σοὶ πρὸς Ὄλυμπον ἐμακύναντο κολοσσὸν
τόνδε Ῥόδου ναέται Δωρίδος, Ἀέλιε,
χάλκεον ἁνίκα κῦμα κατευνάσαντες Ἐνυοῦς
ἔστεψαν πάτραν δυσμενέων ἐνάροις.
οὐ γὰρ ὑπὲρ πελάγους μόνον †κάτθεσαν, ἀλλὰ καὶ ἐν γᾷ,
ἁβρὸν ἀδουλώτου φέγγος ἐλευθερίας·
τοῖς γὰρ ἀφ' Ἡρακλῆος ἀεξηθεῖσι γενέθλας
πάτριος ἐν πόντῳ κἠν χθονὶ κοιρανία.

— The Greek Anthology, W. R. Paton, trans., William Heinemann, London (1916), vol. I, p. 387.
Translation:

To thy very self, O Sun, did the people of Dorian Rhodes
raise high to heaven this colossus,
then, when having laid to rest the brazen wave of war,
they crowned their country with the spoils of their foes.
Not only over the sea, but on the land, too,
did they establish the lovely light of unfettered freedom.
For to those who spring from the race of Heracles
dominion is a heritage both on land and sea.

== Collapse (226 BC) ==
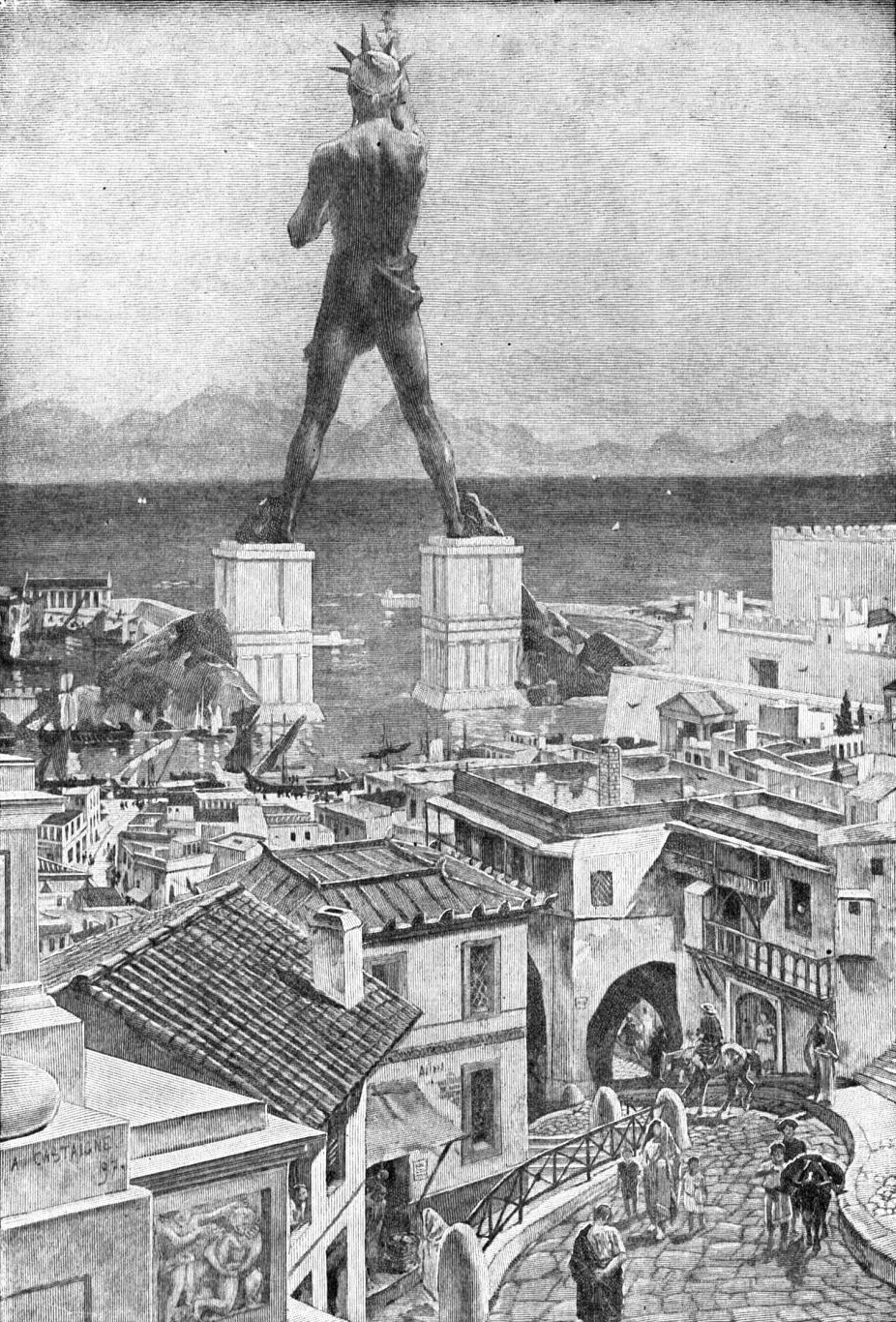
Artist's conception from the Grolier Society's 1911 Book of Knowledge

The statue stood for 54 years until a 226 BC earthquake caused significant damage to large portions of Rhodes, including the harbour and commercial buildings, which were destroyed. The statue snapped at the knees and fell over onto land. Ptolemy III offered to pay for the reconstruction of the statue, but the Oracle of Delphi made the Rhodians fear that they had offended Helios, and they declined to rebuild it.

== Fallen state (226 BC to 653 AD) ==
The remains lay on the ground for over 800 years and, even broken, they were so impressive that many travelled to see them.

The remains were described briefly by Strabo (64 or 63 BC – c. 24 AD), in his work Geography (Book XIV, Chapter 2.5). Strabo was a Greek geographer, philosopher, and historian who lived in Asia Minor during the transitional period of the Roman Republic into the Roman Empire. Strabo is best known for his work Geographica ("Geography"), which presented a descriptive history of people and places from different regions of the world known during his lifetime. Strabo states that:

The city of the Rhodians lies on the eastern promontory of Rhodes; and it is so far superior to all others in harbours and roads and walls and improvements in general that I am unable to speak of any other city as equal to it, or even as almost equal to it, much less superior to it. It is remarkable also for its good order, and for its careful attention to the administration of affairs of state in general; and in particular to that of naval affairs, whereby it held the mastery of the sea for a long time and overthrew the business of piracy, and became a friend to the Romans and to all kings who favoured both the Romans and the Greeks. Consequently, it not only has remained autonomous but also has been adorned with many votive offerings, which for the most part are to be found in the Dionysium and the gymnasium, but partly in other places. The best of these are, first, the Colossus of Helius, of which the author of the iambic verse says, "seven times ten cubits in height, the work of Chares the Lindian"; but it now lies on the ground, having been thrown down by an earthquake and broken at the knees. In accordance with a certain oracle, the people did not raise it again. This, then, is the most excellent of the votive offerings (at any rate, it is by common agreement one of the Seven Wonders).

Pliny the Elder remarked:

But that which is by far the most worthy of our admiration, is the colossal statue of the Sun, which stood formerly at Rhodes, and was the work of Chares the Lindian, a pupil of the above-named Lysippus; no less than seventy cubits in height. This statue fifty-six years after it was erected, was thrown down by an earthquake; but even as it lies, it excites our wonder and admiration. Few men can clasp the thumb in their arms, and its fingers are larger than most statues. Where the limbs are broken asunder, vast caverns are seen yawning in the interior. Within it, too, are to be seen large masses of rock, by the weight of which the artist steadied it while erecting it.

== Destruction of the remains ==
The ultimate fate of the remains of the statue is uncertain. Rhodes has two serious earthquakes per century, owing to its location on the seismically unstable Hellenic arc. Pausanias mentions in the Descriptio Graeciae, writing ca. 174, how the city was so devastated by an earthquake that the sibyl oracle foretelling its destruction was considered fulfilled. This means the statue could not have survived for long if it had ever been repaired. By the 4th century Rhodes was Christianized, so any further maintenance or rebuilding, if there ever was any before, on an ancient pagan statue is unlikely. The metal would probably have been used for coins and maybe also tools by the time of the Arab wars, especially during earlier conflicts such as the Sasanian wars.

The onset of Islamic naval incursions against the Byzantine Empire gave rise to a dramatic account of what became of the Colossus. In 653, an Arab force under Muslim general Mu'awiya I raided Rhodes, and according to the Chronicle of Theophanes the Confessor, the remains of the statue constituted part of the booty, being melted down and sold to a Jewish merchant of Edessa who loaded the bronze onto 900 camels. The same story is recorded by Bar Hebraeus, writing in Syriac in the 13th century in Edessa (after the Arab pillage of Rhodes): "And a great number of men hauled on strong ropes which were tied around the brass Colossus which was in the city and pulled it down. And they weighed from it three thousand loads of Corinthian brass, and they sold it to a certain Jew from Emesa" (the Syrian city of Homs).

Ultimately, Theophanes is the sole source of this account, and all other sources can be traced to him. As Theophanes' source was Syriac, it may have had vague information about a raid and attributed the statue's demise to it, not knowing much more. Or the Arab destruction and the purported sale to a Jew may have been a metaphor for Nebuchadnezzar's dream of the destruction of a great statue.

Given the likely previous neglect of the remains and various opportunities for authorities to have repurposed the metal, as well as the fact that, Islamic incursions notwithstanding, the island remained an important Byzantine strategic point well into the ninth century, an Arabic raid is unlikely to have found much, if any, remaining metal to carry away. For these reasons, as well as the negative perception of the Arab conquests, L.I. Conrad considers Theophanes' story of the dismantling of the statue as likely propaganda, much like the destruction of the Library of Alexandria.

== Posture ==
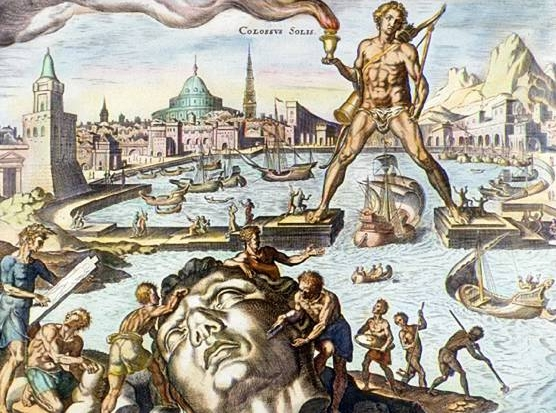
From the 1572 Octo Mundi Miracula, the earliest known representation of the Colossus in modern times.

The harbour-straddling Colossus was a figment of medieval imaginations based on the dedication text's mention of "over land and sea" twice and the writings of an Italian visitor who in 1395 noted that local tradition held that the right foot had stood where the church of St John of the Colossus was then located. Many later illustrations show the statue with one foot on either side of the harbour mouth with ships passing under it. References to this conception are also found in literary works. William Shakespeare's Cassius in Julius Caesar (I, ii, 136–38) says of Caesar:

Why man, he doth bestride the narrow world
Like a Colossus, and we petty men
Walk under his huge legs and peep about
To find ourselves dishonourable graves

Shakespeare alludes to the Colossus also in Troilus and Cressida (V.5) and in Henry IV, Part 1 (V.1).

"The New Colossus" (1883), a sonnet by Emma Lazarus written on a cast bronze plaque and mounted inside the pedestal of the Statue of Liberty in 1903, contrasts the latter with:

The brazen giant of Greek fame
with conquering limbs astride from land to land

While these fanciful images feed the misconception, the mechanics of the situation reveal that the Colossus could not have straddled the harbour as described in Lemprière's Classical Dictionary. If the completed statue had straddled the harbour, then the entire mouth of the harbour would have been effectively closed during the entirety of the construction, and the ancient Rhodians would not have had the means to dredge and re-open the harbour after construction was finished. Additionally, the fallen statue would have blocked the harbour, and since the ancient Rhodians did not have the ability to remove the fallen statue from the harbour, it would not have remained visible on land for the next 800 years, as discussed above. Even neglecting these objections, the statue was made of bronze, and engineering analyses indicate that it could not have been built with its legs apart without collapsing under its own weight.

Many researchers have considered alternative positions for the statue which would have made it more feasible for actual construction by the ancients. There is also no evidence that the statue held a torch aloft; the records simply say that after completion, the Rhodians kindled the "torch of freedom". A relief in a nearby temple shows Helios standing with one hand shielding his eyes (as if saluting) and it is quite possible that the colossus was constructed in the same pose.

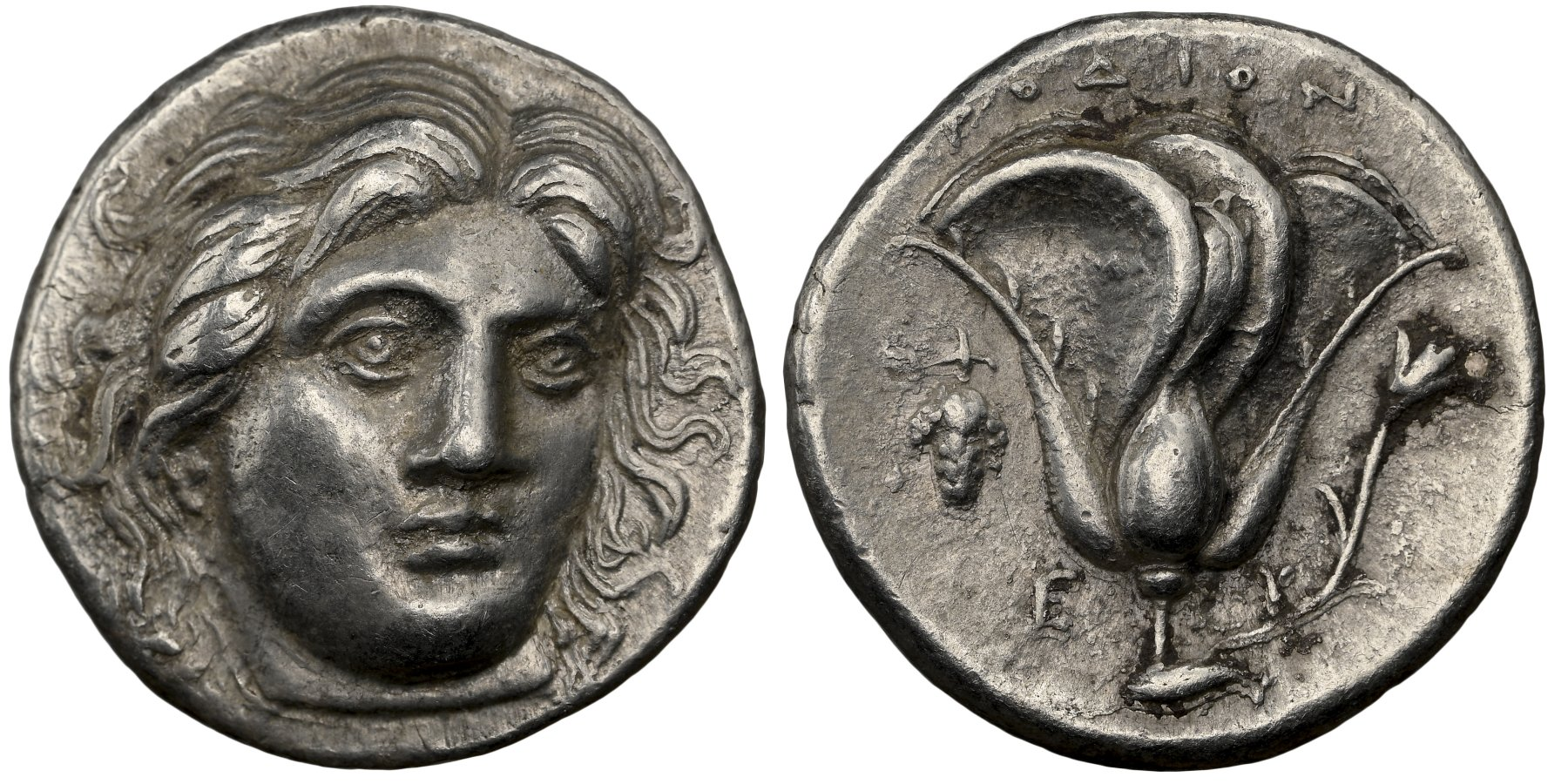
Rhodes Didrachm (305–275 BC) showing the Sun God Helios on obverse and rose with rose bud and grape cluster on the reverse.

While scholars do not know what the statue looked like, they do have a good idea of what the head and face looked like, as it was of a standard rendering at the time. The head would have had curly hair, similar to the images found on contemporary Rhodian coins.

== Possible locations ==
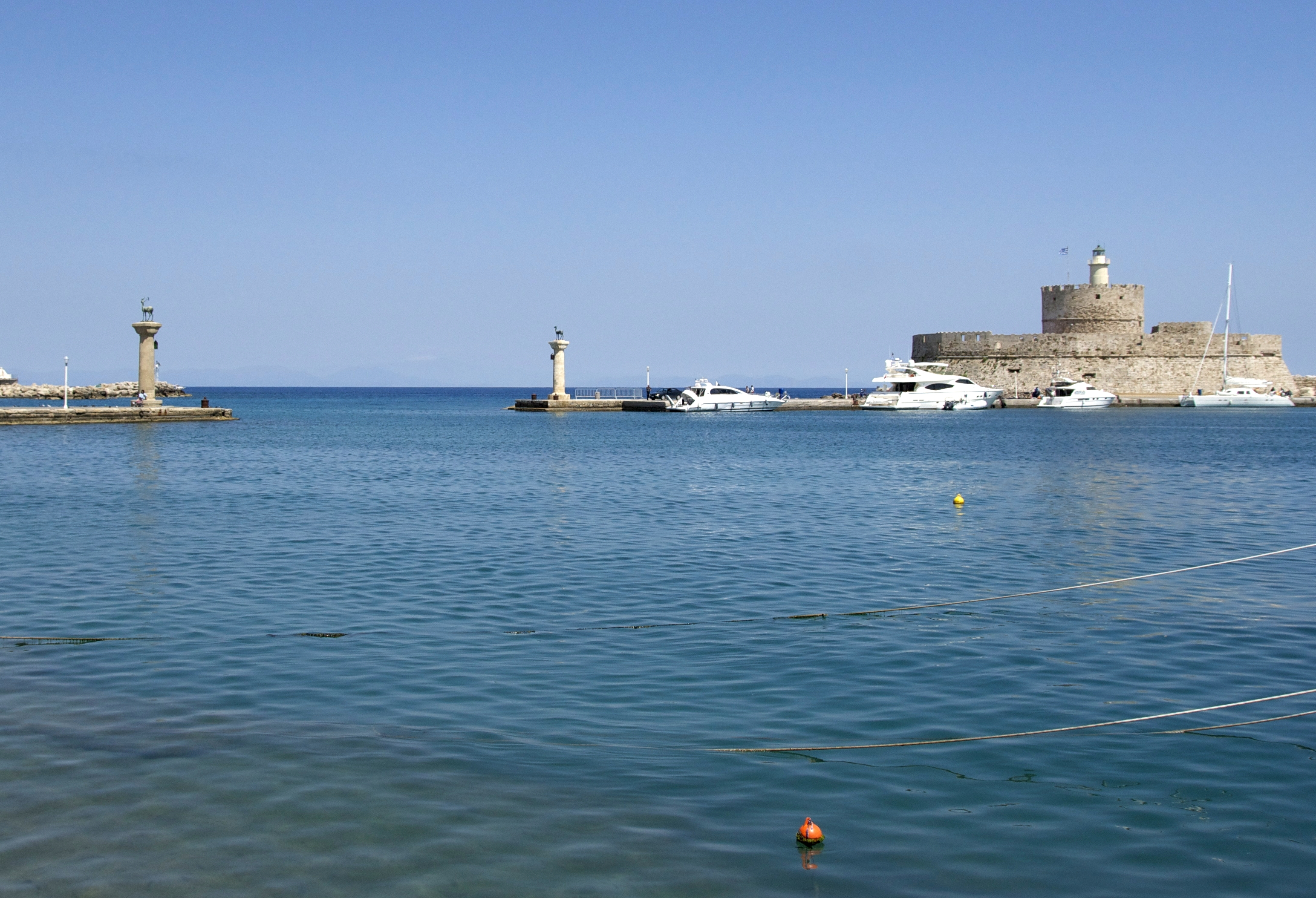
The old harbour entrance from inner embankment. The Fortress of St Nicholas is on the right.

While scholars generally agree that anecdotal depictions of the Colossus straddling the harbour's entry point have no historic or scientific basis, the monument's actual location remains a matter of debate. As mentioned above, the statue is thought locally to have stood where two pillars now stand at the Mandraki port entrance.

The floor of the Fortress of St Nicholas, near the harbour entrance, contains a circle of sandstone blocks of unknown origin or purpose. Curved blocks of marble that were incorporated into the Fortress structure, but are considered too intricately cut to have been quarried for that purpose, have been posited as the remnants of a marble base for the Colossus, which would have stood on the sandstone block foundation.

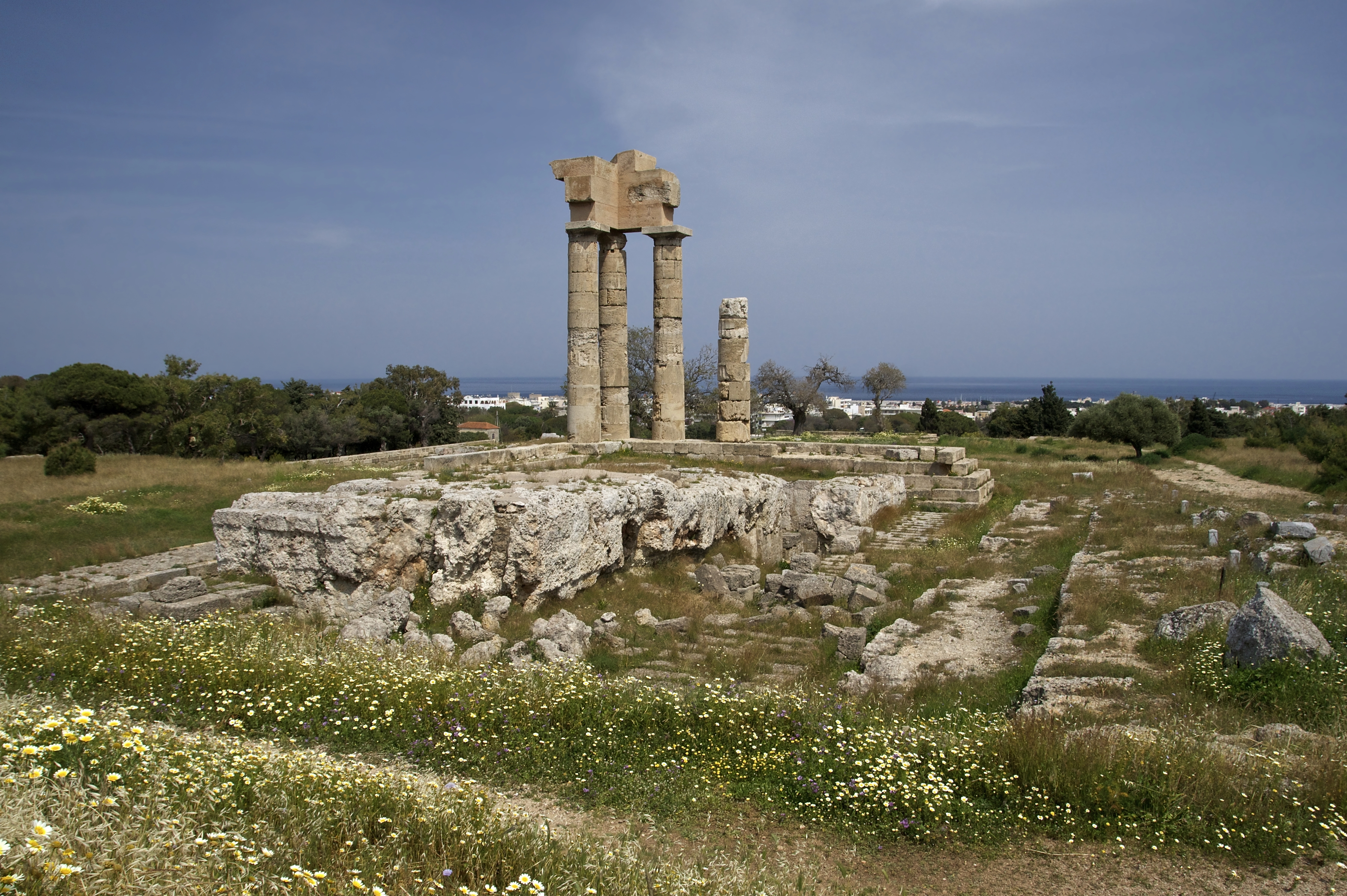
Stone foundation and partially-reconstructed temple ruins at the apex of the Acropolis of Rhodes

Archaeologist Ursula Vedder postulates that the Colossus was not located in the harbour area at all, but rather was part of the Acropolis of Rhodes, which stood on a hill that overlooks the port area. The ruins of a large temple, traditionally thought to have been dedicated to Apollo, are situated at the highest point of the hill. Vedder believes that the structure would actually have been a Helios sanctuary, and a portion of its enormous stone foundation could have served as the supporting platform for the Colossus.

== Modern Colossus projects ==
In 2008, The Guardian reported that a modern Colossus was to be built at the harbour entrance by the German artist Gert Hof leading a Cologne-based team. It was to be a giant light sculpture made partially out of melted-down weapons from around the world. It would cost up to €200 million.

In December 2015, a group of European architects announced plans to build a modern Colossus bestriding two piers at the harbour entrance, despite a preponderance of evidence and scholarly opinion that the original monument could not have stood there. The new statue, 150 metres (490 ft) tall (five times the height of the original), would cost an estimated US$283 million, funded by private donations and crowdsourcing. The statue would include a cultural centre, a library, an exhibition hall, and a lighthouse, all powered by solar panels. No such plans were carried out, however, and the website for the project went offline.

== See also ==
- Twelve Metal Colossi
- The Colossus of Rhodes (Dalí)
- The Colossus of Rhodes (Sergio Leone)
- The New Colossus
- The Rhodes Colossus
- List of tallest statues
- List of tallest structures built before the 20th century

== Sources ==
- Ashley, James R. (2004). The Macedonian Empire: The era of warfare under Philip II and Alexander the Great, 359-323 B.C. McFarland & Company. p. 75. ISBN 0-7864-1918-0. Archived from the original on 2024-05-21.
- Gabriel, Albert (1932). "[no title cited]". Bulletin de Correspondance Hellénique. 56: 331–359. doi:10.3406/bch.1932.2843.
- Maryon, H. (1956). "The Colossus of Rhodes". The Journal of Hellenic Studies. 76: 68–86. doi:10.2307/629554. JSTOR 629554. — sculptor's speculations on the Colossus of Rhodes.
- Haynes, D.E.L. (1957). "Philo of Byzantium and the Colossus of Rhodes". The Journal of Hellenic Studies. 77 (2): 311–312. doi:10.2307/629373. JSTOR 629373. — a response to Maryon (1956).
