= The Colossus of Rhodes (film) =

1961 film directed by Sergio Leone

- US film poster
- Italian: Il Colosso di Rodi
- Directed by: Sergio Leone
- Screenplay by: Ennio De Concini; Sergio Leone; Cesare Seccia; Luciano Martino; Ageo Savioli; Luciano Chitarrini; Carlo Gualtieri
- Produced by: Giuseppe Maggi; Mario Maggi
- Starring: Rory Calhoun; Lea Massari; Georges Marchal; Conrado San Martín; Ángel Aranda
- Cinematography: Antonio L. Ballesteros
- Edited by: Eraldo Da Roma
- Music by: Angelo Francesco Lavagnino
- Production companies: Cine-Produzioni Associate; Procusa Film; Comptoir Français de Productions Cinématographiques; Cinema Television International
- Distributed by: Filmar (Italy); Filmayer (Spain); Comptoir Français du Film (France); Metro-Goldwyn-Mayer (international)
- Release dates: 16 June 1961 (Madrid, premiere); 11 August 1961 (France); 25 August 1961 (Italy); 2 October 1961 (Spain)
- Running time: 142 minutes (Italy); 128 minutes (International)
- Countries: Italy; Spain; France
- Language: Italian

The Colossus of Rhodes (Italian: Il Colosso di Rodi) is a 1961 peplum film co-written and directed by Sergio Leone, in his feature directorial debut. Starring Rory Calhoun and Lea Massari, it is a fictional account of the island of Rhodes during its classical period in the late 3rd-century BCE before coming under Roman control, using the Colossus of Rhodes as a backdrop for the story of a war hero who becomes involved in two different plots to overthrow a tyrannical king: one by Rhodian patriots and the other by Phoenician agents.

The film was Leone's first work as a credited director, he had previously been an uncredited replacement director on The Last Days of Pompeii (1959) after the original director fell ill. It is perhaps the least known of the seven films he officially directed, and is the only one without an Ennio Morricone score.

== Plot ==
In 280 BCE, a Greek military hero named Darios visits his uncle Lissipu on the island of Rhodes. Rhodes has just finished constructing an enormous colossal statue of the god Helios to guard its harbor and is planning an alliance with Phoenicia, which would be hostile to Greece.

Darios flirts with the beautiful Diala, daughter of the statue's mastermind, Carete, while becoming involved with a group of rebels headed by Peliocles. These rebels seek to overthrow Rhodes' tyrannical king Serse, but so does Serse's evil second-in-command, Thar. He has Phoenician soldiers smuggled into Rhodes as slaves, and his men occupy the Colossus to secure safe entrance for the Phoenician fleet.

The rebels learn of this plan and decide to apply to the Greeks for help; Darios, who is forbidden to leave Rhodes as he is suspected of being a spy, is to serve as an unwitting message carrier. But as they try to exit the harbor under the cover of night, they are foiled by the Colossus's defensive weaponry and arrested. Darios is convicted as a fellow conspirator. However, just before the captives are to be executed, the rest of the rebels break them out.

In their hideout, Peliocles decides that the only way to stop the invasion is to control the Colossus and free their fellow rebels who have already been captured and sentenced to work as slaves beneath the Colossus; the release mechanism for the dungeons is located in the statue itself. Darios realizes that without reconnaissance the mission is doomed to fail and tries to enlist Diala's aid, but tells her about the rebels' hideout. Diala, who longs for power, betrays Darios and has Thar have the rebels nearly wiped out – with the exceptions of Mirte and Koros, Peliocles' sister and brother, who have hidden.

Peliocles and his men are captured and forced to provide amusement in the local arena; but just when Darios arrives to publicly expose the traitor's plot, Thar executes his coup and kills Serse and his retainers. The rebels immediately set out to carry out their plan, but the rebellion seems doomed to fail: Darios is captured while he tries to work the release mechanism to the dungeons, and Koros, who accompanies him, is killed. An all-out assault of the rebels on the Colossus is foiled by its formidable arsenal, which forces them to retreat into the city. Thar's soldiers kill Diala's father, who does not want to see his life's work abused.

An earthquake and a violent storm hit the island just as the enemy fleet is visible on the horizon. Thar and his men flee the Colossus when a tremor shakes the structure violently, only to be slain by the rebels in the city streets. Diala, plagued with remorse, frees Darios but is killed by falling debris. As the quake continues, the Colossus topples over and crashes into the harbor bay.

After the fury of nature has passed, Darios and Mirte meet Lissipu outside the ruined city. Lissipu remarks that Darios is now free to leave, but his nephew announces that he will marry Mirte and stay in Rhodes to help make the island peaceful again.

== Cast ==
- Rory Calhoun as Darios
- Lea Massari as Diala
- Georges Marchal as Peliocles
- Conrado San Martín as Thar
- Ángel Aranda as Koros
- Mabel Karr as Mirte
- Mimmo Palmara as Ares
- Roberto Camardiel as King Serse
- Alfio Caltabiano as Creonte
- George Rigaud as Lissipu
- Félix Fernández as Carete
- Yann Larvor as Mahor
- Carlo Tamberlani as Xenon
- Fernando Calzado as Sirione
- Antonio Casas as Phoenician Ambassador
- Ángel Menéndez as Eteocle
- José María Vilches as Eros

== Context ==
The film is set during the time following Alexander the Great’s death (323 BC) but before the rise of the Roman Empire (27 BC), known as the Hellenistic era. Most sword-and-sandal epics of the 1950s and 1960s were set in either classical Greece or even earlier (Hercules, Ulysses, The Giant of Marathon) or the later Roman period (Ben Hur, The Magnificent Gladiator, Quo Vadis). The only other films made during the peplum era to use a Hellenistic setting are Hannibal (1959), Revak the Rebel and Siege of Syracuse (both 1960).

== Production ==
The film was originally meant to star John Derek, but on set he immediately clashed with Sergio Leone and the crew, at first refusing to rehearse scenes, then colliding with the master of arms and attempting to interfere in Leone's directorial duties. Derek was fired in June 1960, and this resulted in a legal case. He was replaced by Rory Calhoun, who all along Leone considered more fitting than Derek for the Dario character, because of his comedic approach to the material and his "tired nonchalance".

Leone filmed exterior scenes at the Laredo Harbour in Cantabria, Spain; the Bay of Biscay, the Manzanares el Real and Ciudad Encantada at Cuenca. The rest of the film was shot at Cinecittà Studios in Rome.

=== Depiction of the Colossus ===
Originally Leone planned to have the Colossus statue with the face of Benito Mussolini, before opting for a less explicit political metaphor and choosing a design inspired by the Stadio dei Marmi statues produced under the fascist regime.

Although no physical references of the original Helios Colossus are known to exist, the structure is rendered in this film as being an Etruscan image of the god Apollo following the kouros style of sculpture, with a slight “archaic smile.” It is about 300 feet high (nearly three times the height of its historical counterpart) and holds a bowl at chest level with elbows raised outward, straddling the harbor entrance. It is also revealed to be a hollow metal sculpture, much on the same order as the Statue of Liberty, with an interior spiral staircase leading to a second set of stairs at the head of the statue; a chain system that runs practically the height of the statue, which controls sliding doors to a dungeon; permanent openings at the pupils of the eyes and the ears, large enough for a man to pass through; a drawbridge-style door hidden in the center chest that opens to the bowl, which can be filled with burning materials, used as an altar, and dumped on anything beneath by means of a divided trap door on its bottom; and a dodecagonal opening that allows for catapults to fire out of the top third of the statue's head.

While the statue in the film is made of iron and burnished brass (or perhaps bronze) and barefoot, barechested and bareheaded, wearing only a short men's Greek-style skirt and a headband, the original poster depicts the statue as highly polished bronze, completely outfitted with full panoply, including an attic helmet.

== Reception ==
According to MGM records the film made a profit of $350,000, and reviews at the time praised the visuals. Overall, however, its reviews tend to range from average to bad - in particular it is faulted for its story, acting, and length.

Retrospective reviews generally describe it as typical for its genre and lacking the distinctive qualities of Leone's later movies. Reviews of the Colossus itself as a setpiece are mixed, with some describing it as genuinely impressive and others as cheesy or overused.

On the review aggregator website Rotten Tomatoes, 56% of 9 critics' reviews are positive, with an average rating of 6.2/10.

== See also ==
- List of historical drama films

== Bibliography ==
- Hughes, Howard (2011). Cinema Italiano - The Complete Guide From Classics To Cult. London - New York: I.B.Tauris. ISBN 9781848856080.
- Frayling, Christopher (2000). Sergio Leone: something to do with death. London - New York: Faber and Faber. ISBN 0571164382.
