= Robert Descharnes =

Robert P. Descharnes (January 1, 1926 – February 15, 2014) was a French photographer, filmmaker and author. He served as Salvador Dalí's secretary and, after the painter's death, administrator of his copyright. He is the author of several books on Dalí.

== Biography ==
Descharnes was born in Nevers on January 1, 1926. In 1950, he met Dalí on a ship while he was the photographer. The two formed a close bond, and collaborated on the experimental film L'Aventure prodigieuse de la dentellière et du rhinocéros, which was never released. He became Dalí's personal secretary in 1981, and rescued him from a fire at his apartment in 1984. Descharnes collected over 60,000 negatives of Dalí's daily life, a fraction of which Descharnes infrequently exhibited in art museums.

For over 40 years, he fought to protect Dalí's legacy from forgeries and fakes. He wrote several reference books on the man's life and work. Descharnes was named a Chevalier of the Ordre des Arts et des Lettres in 2011. He died at the age of 88 at his home in Indre-et-Loire on February 15, 2014.

Descharnes is regarded by some Dalí experts as a controversial figure. His claims regarding the authenticity of some of Dalí's late works have been questioned, as Ian Gibson notes in his definitive biography of the painter, The Shameful Life of Salvador Dalí. Of far greater concern was Descharnes's role in persuading the elderly, infirm painter to transfer his copyright, in 1986, for a period of 20 years to a company managed by Descharnes. Gibson writes, "The contract was prepared by [the Madrid lawyer] Miguel Domenech, who has said that at the time Dalí, he and [Dalí's friend, Antoni] Pitxot were under 'tremendous pressure' from a now power-hungry Descharnes. ... Even when he was well, Dalí had never shown any interest in contracts, or any understanding of their small print. ... It is difficult to believe, therefore, that...he could have grasped its exact nature or its potential consequences. The painter, moreover, was in very poor physical condition at this time." Gibson, who calls Descharnes "a very controversial figure in Spain", notes in a 1997 edition of the television documentary series Omnibus about Dalí and his work that "many of Dalí's associates are still unhappy about this situation", by which he means the circumstances surrounding the signing of the contract in which Dalí assigned his copyright to Descharnes's company.

== Publications ==
- Dalí de Gala, Edita, Lausanne, 1962.
- Oui 1 : la Révolution paranoïaque-critique, Éditions Denoël, Paris, 1971.
- Oui 2 : l'Archangélisme scientifique, Éditions Denoël, Paris, 1971.
- Salvador Dalí, Nouvelles Éditions Françaises, Paris, 1973.
- Tadao, Ogura, Salvador Dalí, Shueisha collection l'Art Moderne du Monde, Tokyo ( 25), 1974.
- Salvador Dalí, Bijitsu Shuppan-Sha, Tokyo, 1978.
- Terayama, S., Dalí: The Book of Great Masters, Shogakukan, Tokyo, 1978.
- Dalí, l’œuvre et l’homme, Edita, Lausanne, 1984
- Dalí, L'Héritage Infernal, Éditions Ramsay-La Marge, Paris, 2002.
