= Acropolis of Rhodes =

Sacred center of the ancient polis of Rhodes

Coordinates: 36.4402°N 28.2109°E

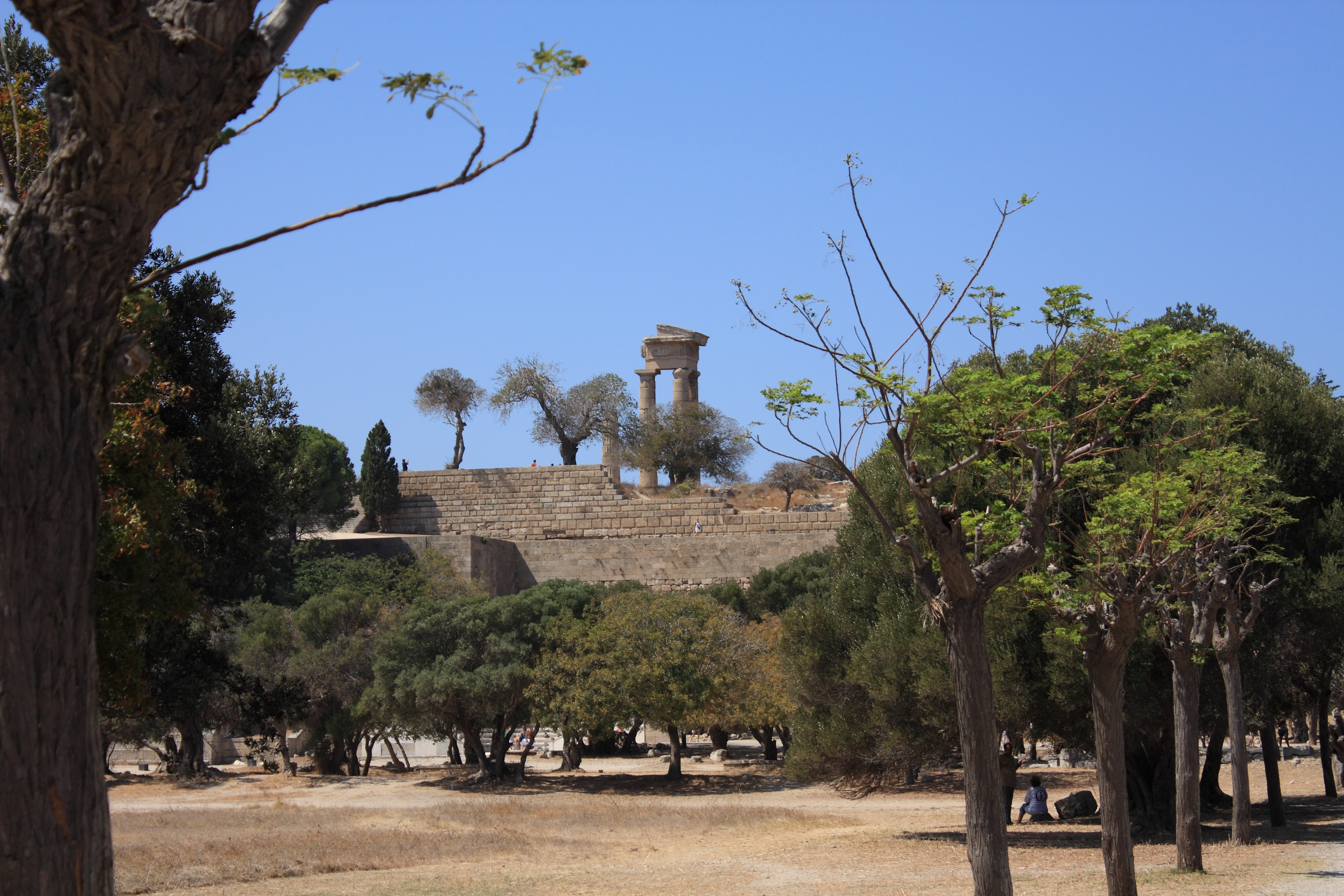
Acropolis of Rhodes

The Acropolis of Rhodes (Greek: Ακρόπολη της Ρόδου) is the acropolis, or upper town, of ancient Rhodes dating from the 5th century BC and located 3 kilometers SW from the centre of the modern city. Situated on Monte Smith overlooking the west coast of the island, the archaeological site includes some of the most important monuments in the ancient city, such as the Temple of Athena Polias and Zeus Polieus and the Temple of Apollo, below which are a stadium, an odeon and a gymnasium. Unlike other acropoleis, no walled citadel was built here.

Plan of the Acropolis

== History ==
In 408 BC, towards the end of the Peloponnesian War, the three cities on the island, Lindos, Kameiros and Ialysos, combined in a synoecism, building a new city as the federal capital in the Ialysia region of the island. The geographer Strabo reports that Hippodamos of Miletus designed the city, but he would have been very old by that time. At any rate, the design can be described as Hippodamian. The city was planned in grid pattern and the upper town was no exception, though in contrast to the dense lower town there were terraced spaces of greenery according to the orator Aelius Aristides. During a flash flood in 316 BC, the upper town provided a refuge to those fleeing the city center, which was inundated due to the drains being clogged. Another momentous event, the Siege of Rhodes (305–304 BC) by Demetrios Poliorcetes, the "City Besieger," may have had an impact on the architectural history of the Acropolis, as the citizens tore down the theater and some temples to build a wall as an emergency stopgap, "vowing to the gods that they would build finer ones." Later, the earthquake in 228 BC provided another opportunity for rebuilding, aided by donations from the entire Greek world. The temple of Athena and Zeus and the temple of Apollo are hellenistic renewals of their classical predecessors. It is no surprise that most of the monuments date from about the period when Rhodes's political and economic influence was at its peak, lasting until 167BC when Delos was turned into a free trade port by Rome. Still, long into the decline of Rhodes, the second century AD author Lucian called it "the city of Helius with a beauty in keeping with that god."

== Excavation and restoration ==
The original excavation was carried on by the Italian School of Archaeology at Athens from 1912 to 1945. Following World War II, the Greek Archaeological Service took over excavation and restoration of the ruins. This included extensive reconstruction of the Temple of Pythian Apollo, which was extensively damaged by bombing and artillery installed there during the war. Excavation began in 1946 and continues today in the Acropolis Archaeological Park, which covers 12,500 square metres (135,000 sq ft) and is protected from any new construction. The extent of excavation is quite small and much awaits investigation. Aside from the known buildings, the theater and the Temple of Helios are believed to be located nearby but are not found.

== Site ==
The Acropolis is situated on the highest part of the ancient city, sloping gently toward the east and bounded to the west by cliffs, upon which watch towers forming the city's perimeter once stood. Mostly dating from the hellenistic period, the monuments were built on stepped terraces, with substantial retaining walls. Though moderate in scale, the buildings have a rhythm and symmetry whose harmonious effects would have been enhanced by the natural landscaping typically suited to sacred space.

=== Temple of Athena Polias and Zeus Polieus ===
Located at the northern extreme of the Acropolis in an east–west orientation, this stately temple was dominated by Doric columned porticos on all sides and originally housed the written treaties the Rhodians held with other states. The temple was bounded by a stoa to the east.

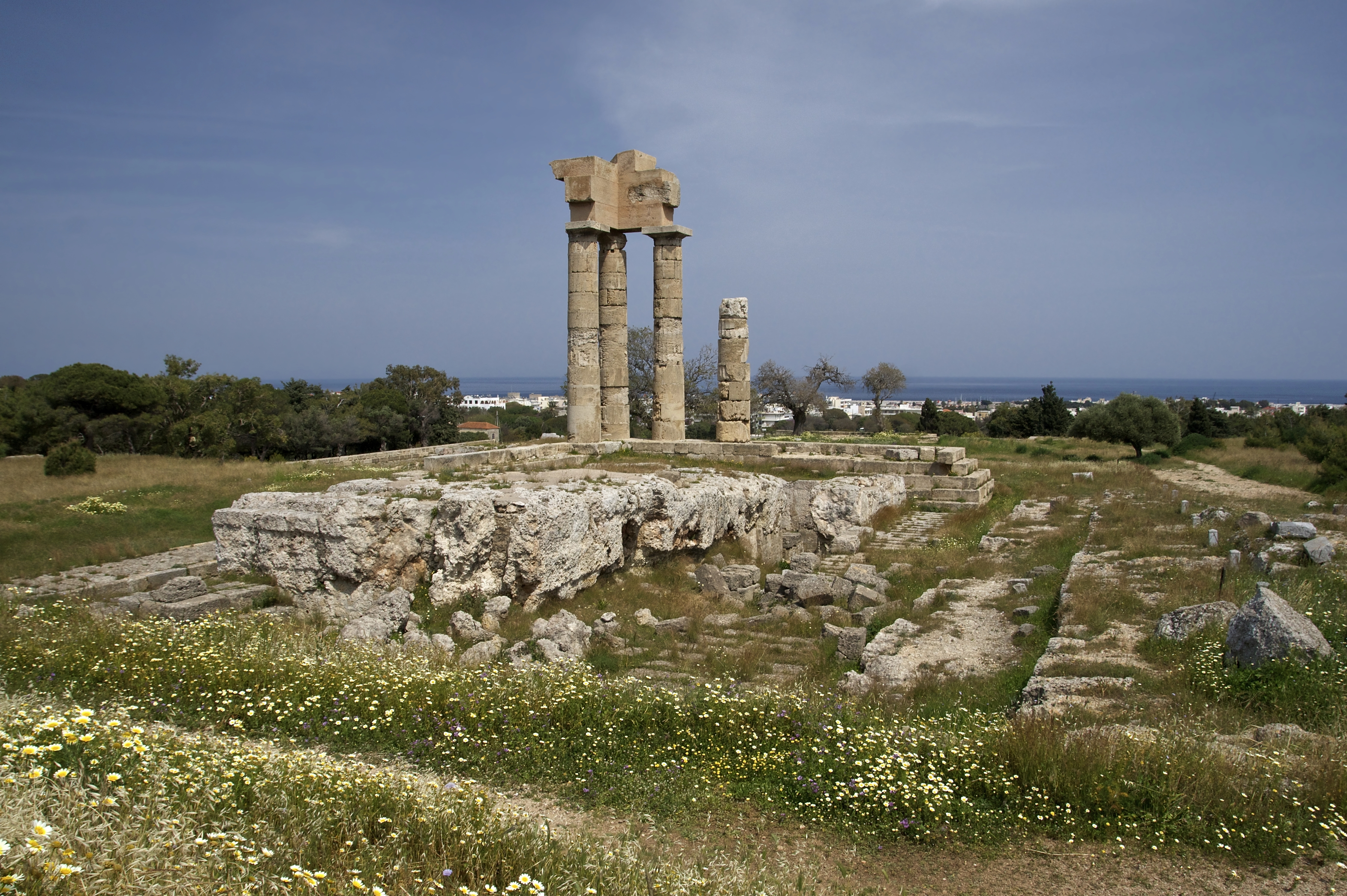
Temple of Apollo

=== Temple of Pythian Apollo ===
Smaller than the Temple of Athena Polias and Zeus Polieus, this structure boasts a similar east–west orientation but is located on the southern end, just west of a large rectangular terrace. Part of the northeast side of this porous peripteral temple has been restored and its retaining wall has survived. It was built in the second century BC in Doric style and was situated in an enclosed precinct. Presenting a distinct profile, in the ancient time it was a landmark for the ships sailing to Rhodes, and even today the reerected columns are visible from the harbor.

=== Nymphaea ===
Just southeast of the Temple of Athena Polias and Zeus Polieus are four subterranean structures cut into the rock, featuring entrance steps, passages, a large opening in the central roof, along with water cisterns, foliage and interior niches for statuettes. Referred to as "nymphaea" due to the association of nymphs with caves and water, these grottoes were used for worship and recreational purposes. Local archaeological finds include figurines of Aphrodite or nymphs which are suitable for display in a niche context, but it is not known exactly what deities were worshiped in the grottoes.

=== Odeon ===
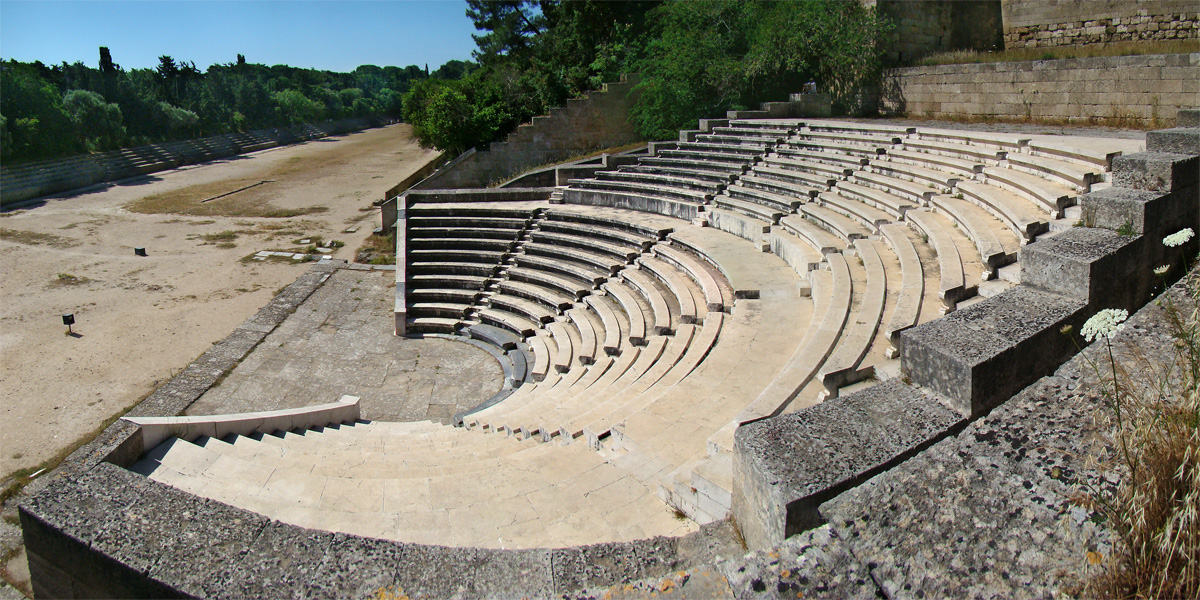
Odeon

This small marble odeon could hold approximately 800 spectators. Situated northwest of the Stadium, it has been heavily reconstructed, as only the orchestra and a few front row seats are original.

=== Stoa building ===
Like the stoa in the acropoleis of Lindos and Kameiros, its design functioned as a reception center for the traffic from the lower town. The impressive façade was visible even from the harbor. Today just one foundation wall remains.

=== Artemision ===
The Artemis cult's place of worship is situated on the northeast side of the hill, amidst the ruins of other structures of similar function.

=== Stadium ===
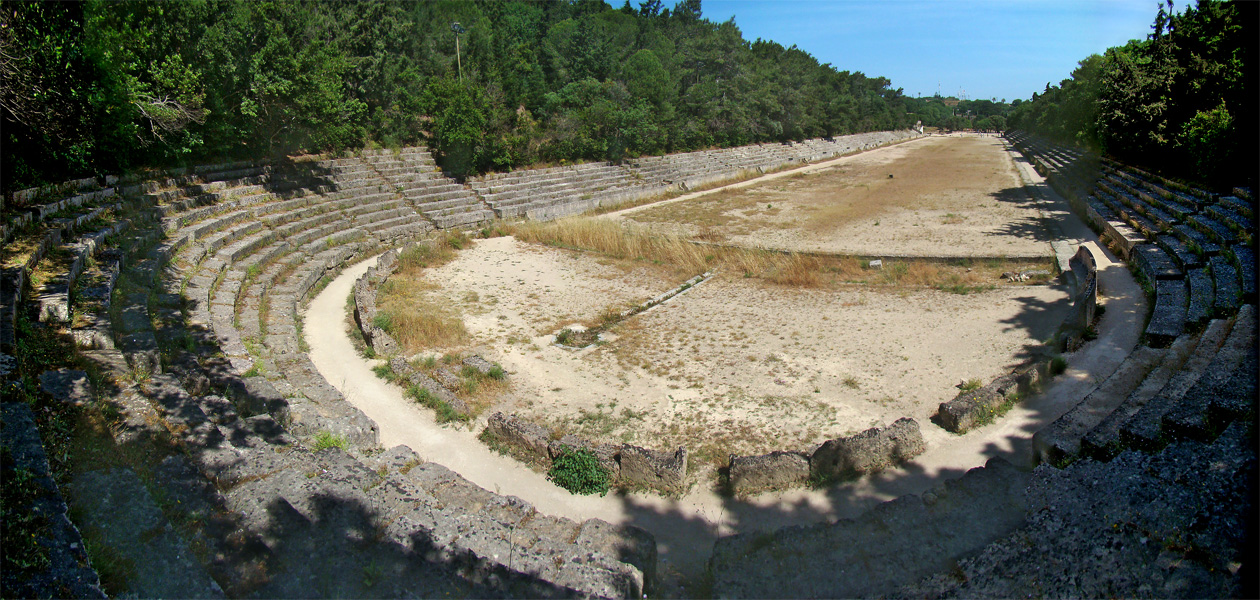
Stadium

Located on the southeast side of the hill, the 210-metre long, north-south oriented Stadium was initially restored by the Italians. Dating to the 3rd century BC, its surviving features include the sphendone (rounded end with turning post), proedries (officials' seats), and some of the spectator seating. The starting apparatus used in the athletic events has also been preserved. Athletic events of the Haleion Games, honoring Helios, were held here.

== References and sources ==
=== References ===
- Berthold, Richard M. (1984), Rhodes in the Hellenistic Age, Ithaca, NY: Cornerll University Press
- Bradford, John (1956), "Fieldwork on Aerial Discoveries in Attica and Rhodes", Antiquaries Journal, 36 (1–2): 57–69, doi:10.1017/S0003581500060364, S2CID 162425810
- Currie, Jean (1979), Rhodos und die Inseln des Dodekanes : ein Kunst- und Reiseführer mit Landeskunde, Stuttgart: Kohlhammer
- Konstantinopoulous, Gregory; Graham, J. Walter (1968), "Rhodes: New Finds and Old Problems", Archaeology, 21 (2): 115–123, JSTOR 41667815
- Nielsen, Thomas H.; Gabrielsen, Vincent (2004), "Rhodos", in Hanse, Mogens H.; Nielsen, Thomas H. (eds.), Inventory of Archaic and Classical Poleis, Oxford, pp. 1196–1210
- "Rhodes Acropolis", Rhodes Guide, September 2009
- Rice, E. E. (1995), "Grottoes on the Acropolis of Hellenistic Rhodes", Annual of the British School at Athens, 90: 383–404, doi:10.1017/S0068245400016269, S2CID 162222722
- Wycherley, Richard E. (1976), "Rhodes", in Stillwell, Richard; MacDonald, William L.; McAlister, Marian Holland (eds.), Princeton Encyclopedia of Classical Sites, Princeton, pp. 755–758
- Wycherley, Richard (1964), "Hippodamus and Rhodes", Historia: Zeitschrift für Alte Geschichte, 13 (2): 135–139
