= 226 BC Rhodes earthquake =

Earthquake in Rhodes, Greece

- Location within Greece
- Local date: 226 BC
- Epicenter: 36.43°N 28.21°E
- Areas affected: Rhodes, Greece

The Rhodes earthquake of 226 BC, which affected the island of Rhodes, Greece, is famous for having toppled the large statue known as the Colossus of Rhodes. Following the earthquake, the statue lay in place for nearly eight centuries before being sold off by invaders. While 226 BC is most often cited as the date of the quake, sources variously cite 226 or 227 BC as dates when it occurred.

== Background ==
The island of Rhodes lies on part of the boundary between the Aegean Sea and African plates. The tectonic setting is complex, with a Neogene history that includes periods of thrusting, extension and strike slip. Currently the island is undergoing a counter-clockwise rotation (17°±5° in the last 800,000 years) associated with the south Aegean sinistral strike-slip fault system.

The island has also been tilted to the northwest during the Pleistocene, an uplift attributed to a reverse fault lying just to the east of Rhodes. The earthquake of c. 227 BC is associated with an uplift of more than three metres and movement on this reverse fault is considered to be the likely causative mechanism for the event. The epicentral location of this event is uncertain, with modern catalogues giving locations either near Rhodes city, or just south of the island of Symi.

Some catalogues suggest that this earthquake caused a significant tsunami. However, a recent review of the evidence has found no clear association.

== History ==
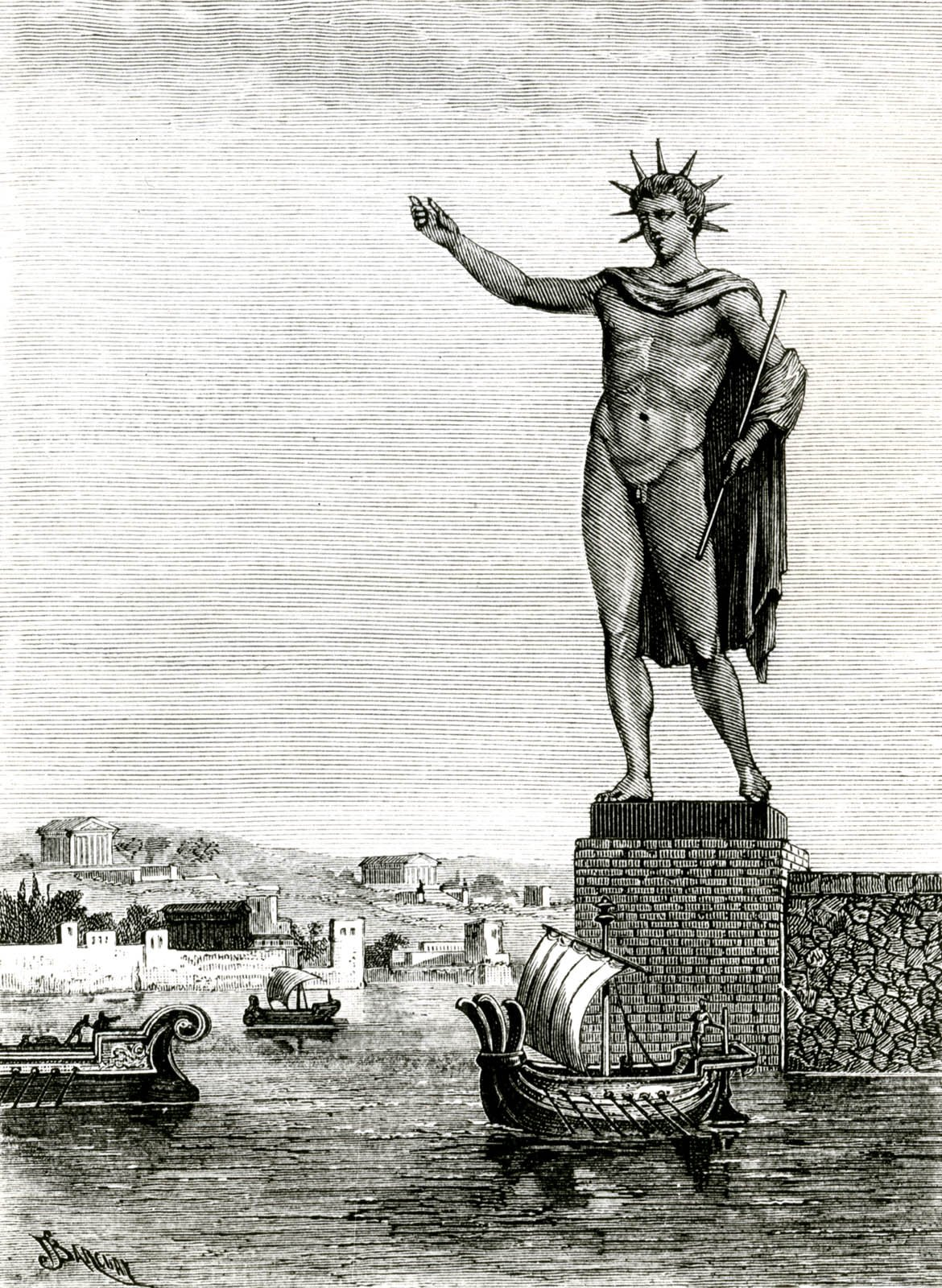
An 1880 portrayal of the Colossus of Rhodes, which was destroyed in the earthquake of 226 BC.

At the time of the earthquake, Rhodes was an Aegean port city which was famous for the large bronze statue that stood near its harbor. It was one of the major trading cities of the Mediterranean Sea, along with the city of Alexandria in Egypt. As evidenced by the taxes the city received in harbor fees, the amount of trade that passed through it was tremendous. Having survived threats from larger neighbors, the city had gained the respect of the Mediterranean world.

The statue, known as the Colossus, had been built before 250 BC to give thanks to the gods for delivering the city safely from a Macedonian siege. Some historical images have shown the Colossus as actually straddling the harbor entrance, a feat which would have been impossible given the bronze-casting technology of the time.

Significant damage was done to large portions of the city, including the harbor and commercial buildings, which were destroyed. The earthquake toppled the Colossus, which lay in pieces near the harbor for centuries. According to the ancient writer Strabo, the statue had broken off at the knees. Strabo reports that an oracle told the citizens of Rhodes not to rebuild it, and an offer by Ptolemy III of Egypt to pay for its reconstruction was turned down.

The Colossus lay in place until 654 AD, when, according to legend, Arab invaders sold the pieces to a Jewish merchant in Edessa. Regardless of their political leadership or government style, respect for the culture and economic importance of the city was such that Greek cities across the region offered assistance to help rebuild. At least two did so by giving the city an exemption from their own customs dues.
