= Dodekanisos Seaways =

Greek ferry company

- Founded: 1999
- Founder: George Spanos
- Fate: active
- Headquarters: Rhodes, Greece
- Area served: Greece, Dodecanese and Northeastern Aegean
- Key people: Chris Spanos, President and CEO
- Services: Passenger transportation Freight transportation
- Website: www.12ne.gr

Dodekanisos Seaways is a Greek ferry company operating from the island of Rhodes to smaller Dodecanese islands and islands of the Northeastern Aegean. Its itineraries cover 17 island destinations: Rhodes, Symi, Panormitis Symi, Kos, Kalymnos, Leros, Lipsi, Patmos, Agathonisi, Kastellorizo, Halki, Tilos, Nisyros, Arkoi, Samos, Ikaria and Fourni. Dodekanisos Seaways owns two catamaran speedboats, the Dodekanisos Express and the Dodekanisos Pride as well as the conventional ship Panagia Skiadeni. Dodekanisos Seaways was awarded as the Best Shipping Company of the year 2015, by Lloyd's List, in the context of the Greek Shipping Awards 2015, while among others, it was awarded praise by the Greek Red Cross, the Municipality of Rhodes and the Central Port Authority of Rhodes.

== History ==
Dodekanisos Seaways was founded in 1999, by George Spanos, in Rhodes. It started with a high-speed catamaran, the Dodekanisos Express, which was built for the company at the Norwegian shipyard Båtservice Mandal AS and delivered in 2000. In 2005, Dodekanisos Seaways built the second high-speed catamaran, the Dodekanisos Pride and in 2011 it bought Panagia Skiadeni.

== Fleet ==
As of October 2018, Dodekanisos Seaways operates the following fleet.

Ship	Flag	Built	Entered service	Gross tonnage	Length	Width	Passengers	Vehicles	Knots	Notes	Photos
Dodekanisos Express	(Greece)	2000	2000	528 GT	40 m	11 m	337	6	33		
Dodekanisos Pride	(Greece)	2005	2005	499 GT	40 m	11.5 m	280	9	33		
Panagia Skiadeni	(Greece)	1986	2011	3.234 GT	84 m	13.5 m	700	115	17	ex Artemisia, Star A, Orient Star, Ferry Tachibana	

== Routes ==
- Rhodes-Symi-Kos-Kalymnos-Leros-Lipsi-Patmos-Agathonisi-Arkoi-Ikaria-Fournoi-Samos (Dodekanisos Pride)
- Rhodes-Chalki-Tilos-Nisyros-Kos-Kalymnos (Dodekanisos Express)
- Rhodes-Symi (Panagia Skiadeni)
- Rhodes-Kastellorizo (Dodekanisos Pride)
