= Marathos Island =

Marathos
- Settlement
- Location within Greece
- Coordinates: 37°22′03″N 26°43′30″E
- Country: Greece
- Administrative region: South Aegean
- Regional unit: Kalymnos
- Municipality: Patmos

Area
  - Total: 0.36 km^{2} (0.14 sq mi)
- Highest elevation: 47 m (154 ft)
- Lowest elevation: 0 m (0 ft)

Population (2021)
  - Total: 10
  - Density: 28/km^{2} (72/sq mi)
- Time zone: UTC+2 (EET)
  - Summer (DST): UTC+3 (EEST)
- Postal code: 855 xx
- Area code: 22470
- Vehicle registration: ΚΧ, ΡΟ, ΡΚ

Marathos or Marathi is a small Greek Island in the Aegean Sea lying east of Patmos island, southwest of Arkoi island, and northwest of Leipsoi island. It is part of the Dodecanese archipelago. It is a small island with an area of 36 hectares (89 acres) but there are a couple of tavernas and few rooms to let.

== Population ==
Historical population
| Year | Pop. | ±% |
|---|---|---|
| 1991 | 2 | — |
| 2001 | 6 | +200.0% |
| 2011 | 5 | −16.7% |
| 2021 | 10 | +100.0% |
