= Farmakonisi =

Greek island in the Aegean Sea

Farmakonisi Φαρμακονήσι
- Settlement
- Location within Greece
- Coordinates: 37°17′24″N 27°05′06″E
- Country: Greece
- Administrative region: South Aegean
- Regional unit: Kalymnos
- Municipality: Leros

Area
  - Total: 3.866 km^{2} (1.493 sq mi)

Population (2021)
  - Total: 21
  - Density: 5.4/km^{2} (14/sq mi)
- Time zone: UTC+2 (EET)
  - Summer (DST): UTC+3 (EEST)
- Postal code: 854 00
- Area code: 22470

Farmakonisi (Greek: Φαρμακονήσι) is a small Greek island and community of the Dodecanese, in the Aegean Sea, Greece. It lies in the middle between the chain of the Dodecanese islands in the west, and the coast of Asia Minor (Turkey) in the east. To the north of it are the island of Agathonisi, to the west the islands of Leipsoi, Patmos and Leros, and to the south the islands of Kalymnos and Pserimos. It forms part of the municipality of Leros, and had at the 2021 census a population of 21 inhabitants. Prominent historical monuments on the island include the church of Agios Georgios (Greek: Άγιος Γεώργιος) and the nearby ruins of an ancient Roman temple.

The area of Farmakonisi is 1.48 sq mi (3.8 km^{2}).

== Name ==
In Antiquity, the island was known as Pharmakousa (Greek: Φαρμακοῦσσα, Latin: Pharmacussa) and took its name from pharmaceutical herbs that were growing on it. Alternative names for it are Pharmakos, whence it is known as Farmaco in Italian. It is known as Bulamaç in Turkish.

== History ==
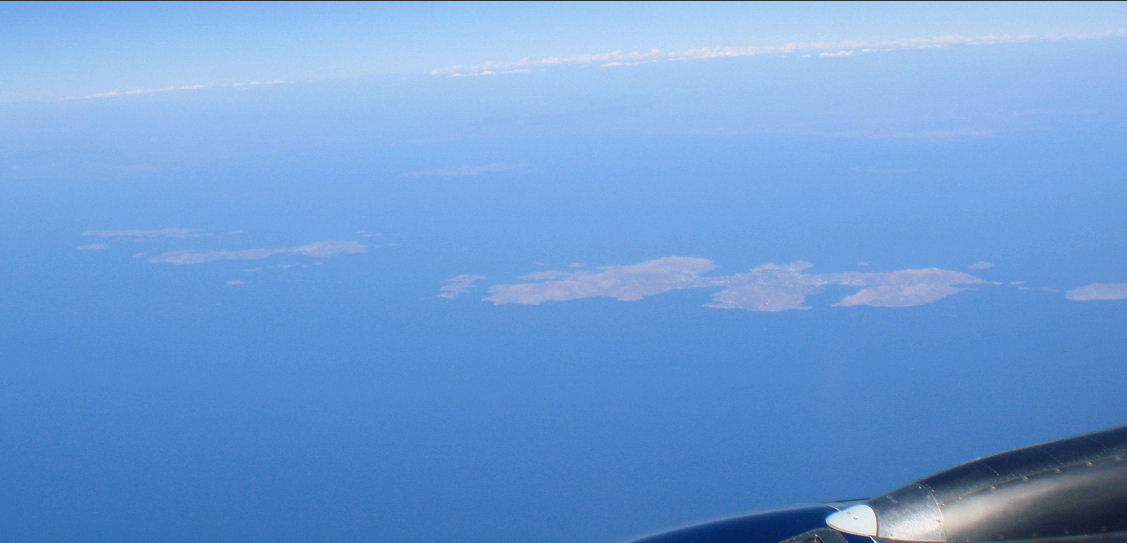
Front, left to right: Arkoi, Leipsoi, Leros. Back, left to right: Agathonisi, Farmakonisi and the Turkish coastline.

In ancient times, Hippocrates used to visit Farmakonisi to gather pharmaceutical herbs. Plutarch in his Parallel Lives tells that the young Julius Caesar, while traveling to Asia Minor, was kidnapped by pirates and held prisoner there 38 days. During his imprisonment he promised them that, if he were freed, he would have all of them killed. After having paid a ransom twice as high as his kidnappers claimed (since he said that the required amount was too low for someone like himself), and having been freed, he organized a fleet and maintained his promise, crucifying all of them.

Farmakonisi, in South Aegean

In modern times, the islet -dependent from Leros- was occupied in 1912 by the Kingdom of Italy during the Italo-Turkish War and, after being part of the Italian Islands of the Aegean, was ceded from Italy to Greece in 1947.

== Administration ==
Since 2011, as part of the Kallikratis Plan, the island has been part of the municipality of Leros.

== Flora ==
Farmakonisi was notable since the ancient times for its very rich flora with several species of herbs growing on the island's surface. The flora is dominated by cedar, while cereals were grown in the small plateau of the island in past times.

== Sources ==
- Bertarelli, L.V. (1929). Guida d'Italia, Vol. XVII (in Italian). Milano: Consociazione Turistica Italiana.
