= Black Island =

Black Island may refer to:

== Places ==
=== Antarctica ===
- Black Island (Ross Archipelago)
- Black Island (Wilhelm Archipelago)

=== Asia ===
- Black Island (Calamian Group), Palawan, Philippines
- Kunashir Island, possibly meaning Black Island, Kuril Islands
- Kuroshima (Okinawa) (Black Island), Japan

=== Europe ===
- Black Island Platform railway station, in an area known as the Black Island, Blair Atholl, Scotland
- Black Island, County Down, a townland in County Down, Northern Ireland
- Black Island, Dartrey Forest, County Monaghan, Ireland
- Duvillaun (Black Island), North Mayo, Ireland
- Pico Island, traditionally Black Island, Azores

=== North America ===
- Black Island (Bahamas), an island of the Bahamas
- Black Island, Friday Bay, Newfoundland and Labrador, Canada
- Black Island, Hecla-Grindstone Provincial Park, Manitoba, Canada
- Black Island (Ontario), an island of Ontario, Canada
- Black Island, Georgia, U.S.
- Black Island, Missouri, U.S.
- Black Island, the name of several islands of the United States
- Black Island, Estero Bay (Florida), U.S.
- Black Island, Lake Memphremagog, U.S.

=== South America ===
- Isla Negra (Black island), Chile

=== Oceania ===
- Black Island (Tasmania), Australia
- Black Island, Whitsunday Islands, Queensland, Australia

== Other uses ==
- "Black Island" (song), a 1999 song by Cuba
- Black Island (film), a 2021 German film
- The Black Island, a comic book in the Adventures of Tintin series, about a fictional island off the coast of Scotland

== See also ==
- Black Isle, a peninsula in Scotland
- Eilean Dubh (disambiguation) (Scottish Gaelic for 'Black Island')
- Kara Ada (disambiguation) (Turkish for 'Black Island')
