= List of islands called Eilean Dubh =

Eilean Dubh means 'Black Island' in Scottish Gaelic. Several islands in Scotland are called Eilean Dubh, including:

- Eilean Dubh, Balnakeil Bay, an island in Balnakeil Bay, near Durness in Sutherland
- Eilean Dubh, Kyles of Bute, an island in the Kyles of Bute
- Eilean Dubh, Loch Craignish, an island in Loch Craignish, south of Oban in Argyll
- Eilean Dubh, Sound of Jura, an island in the Sound of Jura
- Eilean Dubh, Summer Isles, an island in the Summer Isles group
- Eilean Dubh, two separate islets neighbouring Erraid, Inner Hebrides
- Eilean Dubh, a small freshwater island in Loch Shiel
- Eilean Dubh, an islet connected to Eilean Mòr, Loch Dunvegan at low tide
- Eilean Dubh a' Chumhainn Mhòir, an island in Loch Tarbert, Jura
- Eilean Dubh Mòr, an island in the Firth of Lorne
- Eilean Dubh Beag, an island in the Firth of Lorne
- Eilean Dubh Beag, an islet north of Eilean Dubh in Loch Dunvegan
- Eilean Dubh Mòr, a freshwater islet in Loch Sgadabhagh, North Uist
- Dubh Eilean, a tidal islet west of Oronsay

== See also ==
- Black Island (disambiguation)
- Eilean Dubh (disambiguation)
- List of Inner Hebrides
- List of Outer Hebrides
- List of islands of Scotland
- An t-Eilean Dubh, the Gaelic name for the Black Isle area in Ross and Cromarty
