= Dodecanese =

Group of Greek islands

Dodecanese Δωδεκάνησα
- Former prefecture
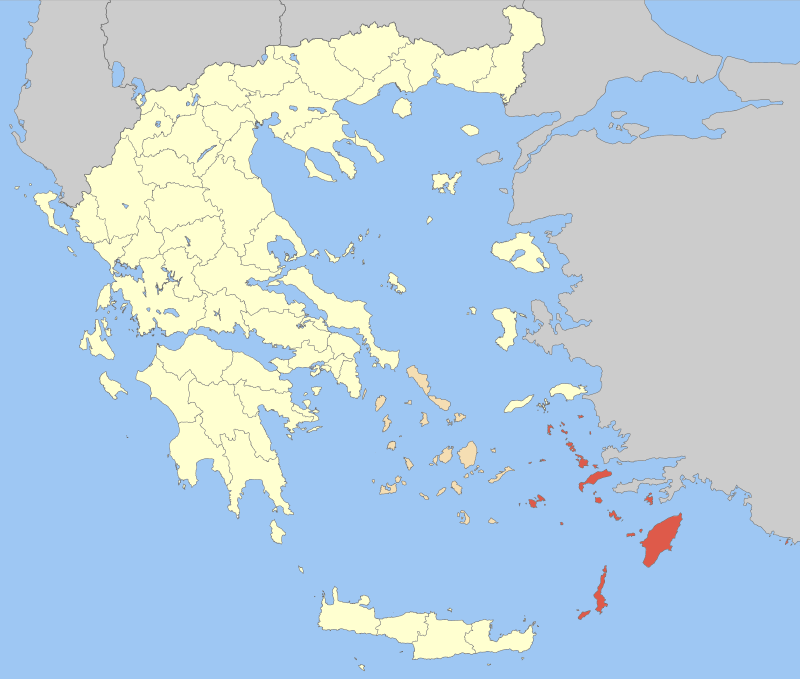
- Location of Dodecanese in Greece

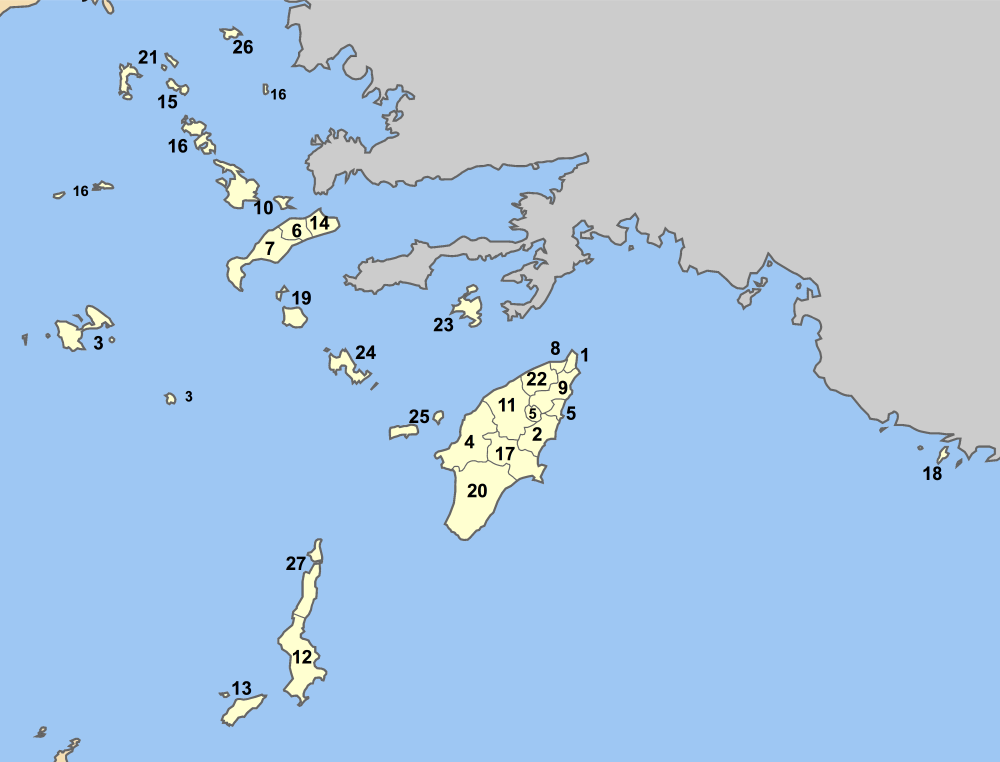
- Location of municipalities within Dodecanese Prefecture
- Coordinates: 36.45°N 27.30°E
- Country: Greece
- Periphery: South Aegean
- Capital: Rhodes
- Subdivisions: List: 5 provinces; 25 municipalities; 2 communities

Area
  - Total: 2,714 km^{2} (1,048 sq mi)
  - Rank: 18th

Population (2005)
  - Total: 200,452
  - Rank: 12th
  - Density: 73.86/km^{2} (191.3/sq mi)
  - Rank: 14th
- Postal codes: 85x xx
- Area codes: 2241-2247
- ISO 3166 code: GR-81
- Vehicle registration: ΚΧ, ΡΚ, PO, ΡΥ

The Dodecanese (UK: /ˌdoʊdɪkəˈniːz/, US: /doʊˌdɛkəˈniːz/; Greek: Δωδεκάνησα, Dodekánisa [ðoðeˈkanisa], lit. 'twelve islands') are a group of 15 larger and 150 smaller Greek islands in the southeastern Aegean Sea and Eastern Mediterranean, off the coast of Anatolia, of which 26 are inhabited. This island group generally defines the eastern limit of the Sea of Crete. They belong to the wider Southern Sporades island group.

Rhodes has been the area's dominant island since antiquity. Of the others, Kos and Patmos are historically the most important; the remaining 12 are Agathonisi, Astypalaia, Halki, Kalymnos, Karpathos, Kasos, Leipsoi, Leros, Nisyros, Symi, Tilos, and Megisti. Other islands in the chain include Alimia, Arkoi, Farmakonisi, Gyali, Kinaros, Levitha, Marathos, Nimos, Pserimos, Saria, Strongyli and Syrna.

== Name ==
The name "Dodecanese" (older form ἡ Δωδεκάνησος, hē Dōdekanēsos; modern τα Δωδεκάνησα, ta Dōdekanēsa), meaning "The Twelve Islands" denotes today an island group in the southeastern Aegean Sea, comprising 15 major islands (Agathonisi, Astypalaia, Chalki, Kalymnos, Karpathos, Kasos, Kastellorizo, Kos, Lipsi, Leros, Nisyros, Patmos, Rhodes, Symi, and Tilos) and 93 smaller islets. Since Antiquity, these islands formed part of the group known as the "Southern Sporades" (Νότιες Σποράδες).

The name Dōdekanēsos first appears in Byzantine-period sources in the 8th century, as a naval command under a droungarios, encompassing the southern Aegean Sea, which eventually evolved into the Theme of Samos. It was not applied to the current island group, but to the 12 Cyclades islands clustered around Delos. The name may indeed be of a far earlier date, and modern historians suggest that the 12 islands Strabo mentions (Geographica Χ.485) were the origin of the term. The term remained in use throughout the medieval period and was still used for the Cyclades in both colloquial usage and scholarly Greek-language literature until the 18th century.

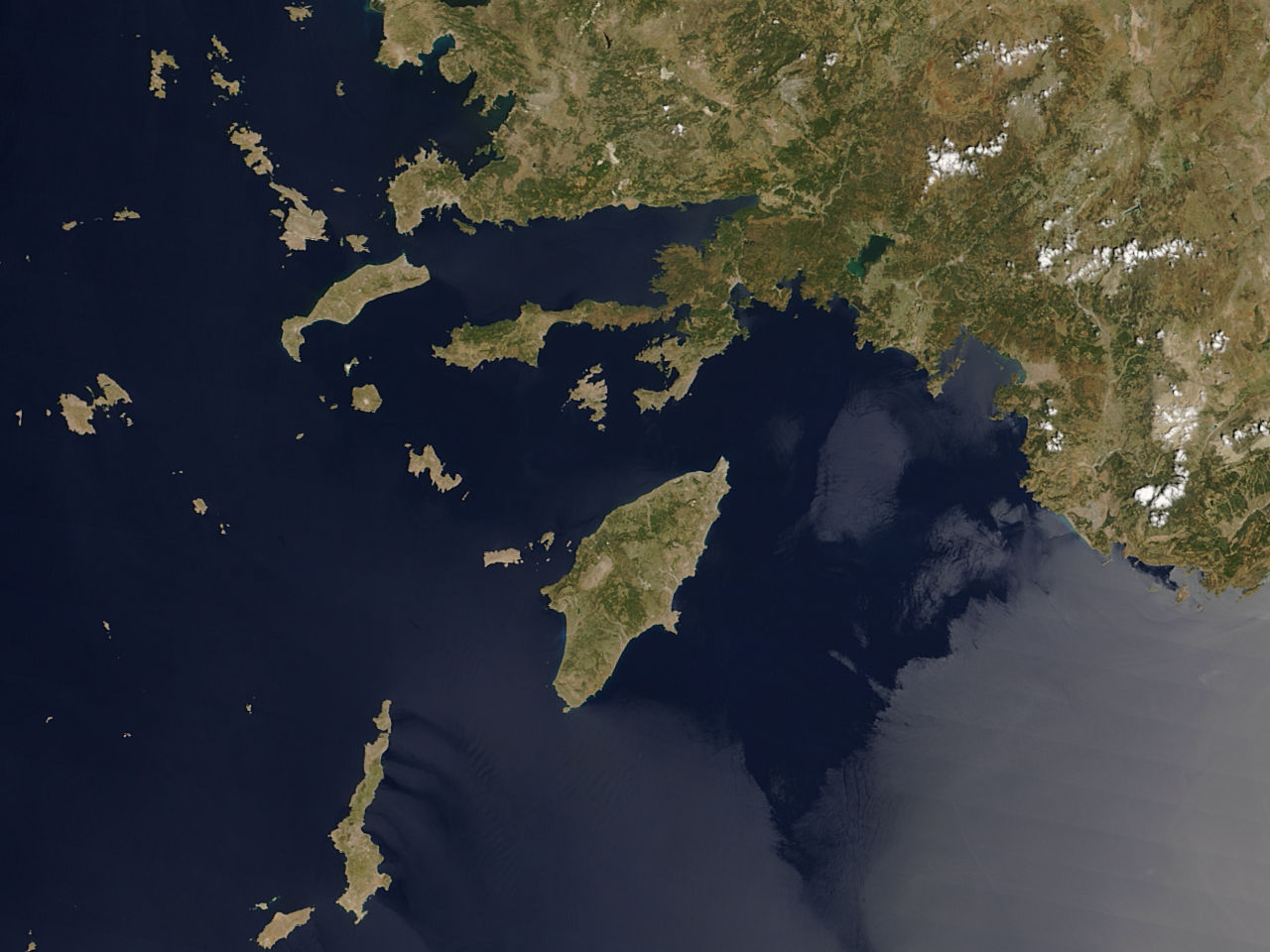
Satellite image from NASA Visible Earth

The transfer of the name to the present-day Dodecanese has its roots in the Ottoman period. Upon the Ottoman conquest of the islands held by the Knights Hospitaller in 1522, the two larger islands, Rhodes and Kos, came under direct Ottoman rule, while the others, of which the 12 main islands were usually named, enjoyed extensive privileges pertaining to taxation and self-government. Concerted attempts to abolish these privileges were made after 1869, as the Ottoman Empire attempted to modernize and centralize its administrative structure, and the last vestiges of the old privileges were finally abolished after the Young Turks took power in 1908. It was at that time that the press in the independent Kingdom of Greece began referring to the 12 privileged islands (Astypalaia, Chalki, Ikaria, Kalymnos, Karpathos, Kasos, Kastellorizo, Leros, Nisyros, Patmos, Symi and Tilos), in the context of their attempts to preserve their privileges, collectively as the "Dodecanese". Shortly afterward, in 1912, most of the Southern Sporades were captured by the Italians in the Italo-Turkish War, except for Ikaria, which joined Greece in 1912 during the First Balkan War, and Kastellorizo, which came under Italian rule only in 1921. The place of the latter two was taken by Kos and Rhodes, bringing the number of the major islands under Italian rule back to 12. Thus, when the Greek press began agitating for the cession of the islands to Greece in 1913, the term used was still the "Dodecanese". The Italian occupation authorities helped establish the term when they named the islands under their control "Rhodes and the Dodecanese" (Rodi e Dodecaneso), adding Leipsoi to the list of the major islands to make up for considering Rhodes separately.

By 1920, the name had become firmly established for the entire island group, as acknowledged by the Italian government when it appointed the islands' first civilian governor, Count Carlo Senni, as "Viceroy of the Dodecanese". As the name was associated with Greek irredentism, from 1924 Mussolini's Fascist regime tried to abolish its use by calling them the "Italian Islands of the Aegean", but this name never acquired any currency outside Italian administrative usage. The islands joined Greece in 1947 following as the "Governorate-General of the Dodecanese" (Γενική Διοίκησις Δωδεκανήσου), after 1955 the "Dodecanese Prefecture" (Νομός Δωδεκανήσου).

== Geography ==
The Dodecanese are in the South East Aegean sea and are bordered by Turkey in the East, Crete in the southwest and the Cyclades in the west.

=== Climate ===
Most of the Dodecanese have a hot-summer Mediterranean climate (Csa in the Köppen climate classification) while Karpathos, Kasos and Nisyros have a hot semi-arid climate (Köppen climate classification: BSh) with mild winters and hot summers. Rhodes Port, Kasos, Karpathos and Kastellorizo record among the mildest winters in Europe. South East Rhodes experiences a significantly warmer climate with Lindos registering a mean annual temperature of around 22.0 °C (71.6 °F), making it the warmest area in Greece. Moreover, according to the Hellenic National Meteorological Service, South East Rhodes records the highest mean annual sunshine in Greece with over 3,100 hours.

Climate data for Rhodes International Airport, Paradeisi 7 m a.s.l. (1996-2026). Extremes 1977-present Climate: Hot-summer Mediterranean climate (Csa) • USDA: 11a (4.44°C)
Month	Jan	Feb	Mar	Apr	May	Jun	Jul	Aug	Sep	Oct	Nov	Dec	Year
Record high °C (°F)	21.0 (69.8)	22.6 (72.7)	27.6 (81.7)	29.6 (85.3)	34.6 (94.3)	39.4 (102.9)	38.0 (100.4)	40.2 (104.4)	34.8 (94.6)	33.0 (91.4)	28.0 (82.4)	23.4 (74.1)	40.2 (104.4)
Mean daily maximum °C (°F)	15.4 (59.7)	15.6 (60.1)	17.4 (63.3)	20.2 (68.4)	24.0 (75.2)	27.9 (82.2)	30.5 (86.9)	30.7 (87.3)	28.2 (82.8)	24.6 (76.3)	20.8 (69.4)	17.1 (62.8)	22.7 (72.9)
Daily mean °C (°F)	13.2 (55.8)	13.2 (55.8)	14.8 (58.6)	17.3 (63.1)	21.0 (69.8)	25.0 (77.0)	27.5 (81.5)	27.9 (82.2)	25.6 (78.1)	21.9 (71.4)	18.2 (64.8)	14.8 (58.6)	20.0 (68.1)
Mean daily minimum °C (°F)	10.9 (51.6)	10.8 (51.4)	12.2 (54.0)	14.5 (58.1)	18.1 (64.6)	22.0 (71.6)	24.5 (76.1)	25.1 (77.2)	23.0 (73.4)	19.3 (66.7)	15.5 (59.9)	12.4 (54.3)	17.4 (63.2)
Record low °C (°F)	1.4 (34.5)	1.2 (34.2)	1.8 (35.2)	5.8 (42.4)	11.0 (51.8)	14.4 (57.9)	17.5 (63.5)	21.0 (69.8)	17.0 (62.6)	8.8 (47.8)	6.0 (42.8)	4.0 (39.2)	1.2 (34.2)
Average rainfall mm (inches)	130.3 (5.13)	81.3 (3.20)	55.3 (2.18)	32.7 (1.29)	18.7 (0.74)	2.0 (0.08)	0.7 (0.03)	1.3 (0.05)	7.9 (0.31)	41.4 (1.63)	97.1 (3.82)	137.8 (5.43)	606.5 (23.89)
Mean monthly sunshine hours	151.9	166.8	228.7	273.0	325.8	370.1	391.4	362.5	307.7	255.6	192.4	154.2	3,180.1
Source: Hellenic National Meteorological Service (Apr 1996-Mar 2026), Infoclimat, Extremes from 1977, Sunshine (Jul 2000-Mar 2026)

Climate data for Karpathos Airport (Hellenic National Meteorological Service) 1996‍–‍2026
Month	Jan	Feb	Mar	Apr	May	Jun	Jul	Aug	Sep	Oct	Nov	Dec	Year
Mean daily maximum °C (°F)	16.2 (61.2)	16.1 (61.0)	17.3 (63.1)	19.7 (67.5)	23.6 (74.5)	27.3 (81.1)	29.2 (84.6)	29.5 (85.1)	27.7 (81.9)	24.5 (76.1)	21 (70)	17.7 (63.9)	22.5 (72.5)
Daily mean °C (°F)	13.8 (56.8)	13.7 (56.7)	14.9 (58.8)	17.1 (62.8)	20.7 (69.3)	24.3 (75.7)	26.4 (79.5)	26.9 (80.4)	25.1 (77.2)	21.8 (71.2)	18.5 (65.3)	15.4 (59.7)	19.9 (67.8)
Mean daily minimum °C (°F)	11.4 (52.5)	11.4 (52.5)	12.5 (54.5)	14.5 (58.1)	17.8 (64.0)	21.4 (70.5)	23.6 (74.5)	24.2 (75.6)	22.5 (72.5)	19.2 (66.6)	16.1 (61.0)	13 (55)	17.3 (63.1)
Average rainfall mm (inches)	67.6 (2.66)	45.4 (1.79)	32 (1.3)	14.7 (0.58)	12.3 (0.48)	2.09 (0.08)	0.01 (0.00)	0 (0)	4.78 (0.19)	11.6 (0.46)	30.3 (1.19)	71.6 (2.82)	292.38 (11.55)
Source: (Mar 1996 – Feb 2026)

Climate data for Rhodes Port 4 m a.s.l.
Month	Jan	Feb	Mar	Apr	May	Jun	Jul	Aug	Sep	Oct	Nov	Dec	Year
Record high °C (°F)	20.8 (69.4)	20.9 (69.6)	24.6 (76.3)	27.6 (81.7)	36.4 (97.5)	37.9 (100.2)	37.4 (99.3)	37.6 (99.7)	34.4 (93.9)	32.6 (90.7)	26.8 (80.2)	22.2 (72.0)	37.9 (100.2)
Mean daily maximum °C (°F)	16.1 (61.0)	16.4 (61.5)	17.3 (63.1)	20.2 (68.4)	23.9 (75.0)	27.9 (82.2)	30.9 (87.6)	30.7 (87.3)	28.6 (83.5)	25.6 (78.1)	21.9 (71.4)	18.4 (65.1)	23.2 (73.7)
Daily mean °C (°F)	14.0 (57.2)	14.3 (57.7)	15.1 (59.2)	18.0 (64.4)	21.4 (70.5)	25.3 (77.5)	28.2 (82.8)	28.4 (83.1)	26.5 (79.7)	23.4 (74.1)	19.7 (67.5)	16.3 (61.3)	20.9 (69.6)
Mean daily minimum °C (°F)	11.9 (53.4)	12.2 (54.0)	12.9 (55.2)	15.7 (60.3)	18.9 (66.0)	22.4 (72.3)	25.3 (77.5)	26.0 (78.8)	24.4 (75.9)	21.3 (70.3)	17.5 (63.5)	14.2 (57.6)	18.6 (65.4)
Record low °C (°F)	2.9 (37.2)	4.7 (40.5)	3.8 (38.8)	9.4 (48.9)	14.2 (57.6)	16.2 (61.2)	22.4 (72.3)	23.1 (73.6)	18.7 (65.7)	17.1 (62.8)	9.3 (48.7)	9.0 (48.2)	2.9 (37.2)
Average rainfall mm (inches)	113.6 (4.47)	58.5 (2.30)	44.5 (1.75)	19.2 (0.76)	6.5 (0.26)	6.3 (0.25)	0.1 (0.00)	0.3 (0.01)	14.1 (0.56)	22.3 (0.88)	89.4 (3.52)	144.1 (5.67)	518.9 (20.43)
Mean monthly sunshine hours	155.4	187.0	238.8	269.3	326.8	374.8	393.5	363.7	311.8	264.8	193.7	153.7	3,233.3
Source 1: Municipal Port Fund of South Dodecanese (Jan 2019-Mar 2025)
Source 2: Sunshine Rhodes AP

Climate data for Fri 4 m a.s.l.
Month	Jan	Feb	Mar	Apr	May	Jun	Jul	Aug	Sep	Oct	Nov	Dec	Year
Record high °C (°F)	22.5 (72.5)	25.2 (77.4)	25.8 (78.4)	30.5 (86.9)	36.7 (98.1)	37.2 (99.0)	35.7 (96.3)	36.9 (98.4)	35.7 (96.3)	32.8 (91.0)	27.4 (81.3)	24.4 (75.9)	37.2 (99.0)
Mean daily maximum °C (°F)	16.2 (61.2)	16.3 (61.3)	17.5 (63.5)	19.9 (67.8)	23.4 (74.1)	26.2 (79.2)	28.2 (82.8)	28.3 (82.9)	26.8 (80.2)	23.8 (74.8)	20.9 (69.6)	17.9 (64.2)	22.1 (71.8)
Daily mean °C (°F)	14.1 (57.4)	14.1 (57.4)	15.2 (59.4)	17.3 (63.1)	20.7 (69.3)	24.0 (75.2)	26.2 (79.2)	26.6 (79.9)	25.0 (77.0)	21.8 (71.2)	18.9 (66.0)	15.8 (60.4)	20.0 (68.0)
Mean daily minimum °C (°F)	11.9 (53.4)	12.0 (53.6)	12.8 (55.0)	14.6 (58.3)	18.0 (64.4)	21.8 (71.2)	24.2 (75.6)	24.9 (76.8)	23.2 (73.8)	19.9 (67.8)	16.8 (62.2)	13.8 (56.8)	17.8 (64.1)
Record low °C (°F)	2.7 (36.9)	4.3 (39.7)	5.2 (41.4)	7.2 (45.0)	13.6 (56.5)	16.2 (61.2)	20.4 (68.7)	21.1 (70.0)	17.6 (63.7)	14.4 (57.9)	11.1 (52.0)	6.3 (43.3)	2.7 (36.9)
Average rainfall mm (inches)	54.8 (2.16)	31.0 (1.22)	35.7 (1.41)	12.0 (0.47)	9.1 (0.36)	1.7 (0.07)	0.9 (0.04)	0.3 (0.01)	3.3 (0.13)	20.7 (0.81)	26.9 (1.06)	53.4 (2.10)	249.8 (9.84)
Source 1: Karpathiakanea.gr
Source 2: National Observatory of Athens Monthly Bulletins (Jul 2010-Jan 2026) and World Meteorological Organization

Climate data for Kastellorizo 5 m a.s.l.
Month	Jan	Feb	Mar	Apr	May	Jun	Jul	Aug	Sep	Oct	Nov	Dec	Year
Record high °C (°F)	20.6 (69.1)	22.3 (72.1)	26.1 (79.0)	29.6 (85.3)	34.8 (94.6)	40.8 (105.4)	40.8 (105.4)	40.1 (104.2)	36.6 (97.9)	37.4 (99.3)	27.7 (81.9)	23.2 (73.8)	40.8 (105.4)
Mean daily maximum °C (°F)	16.8 (62.2)	16.9 (62.4)	18.6 (65.5)	21.9 (71.4)	26.2 (79.2)	30.0 (86.0)	34.2 (93.6)	33.7 (92.7)	31.1 (88.0)	27.3 (81.1)	22.8 (73.0)	18.7 (65.7)	24.8 (76.7)
Daily mean °C (°F)	14.6 (58.3)	14.5 (58.1)	15.8 (60.4)	18.7 (65.7)	22.6 (72.7)	26.3 (79.3)	30.1 (86.2)	30.3 (86.5)	28.1 (82.6)	24.5 (76.1)	20.4 (68.7)	16.5 (61.7)	21.9 (71.4)
Mean daily minimum °C (°F)	12.3 (54.1)	12.0 (53.6)	13.0 (55.4)	15.6 (60.1)	19.0 (66.2)	22.6 (72.7)	26.1 (79.0)	26.9 (80.4)	25.2 (77.4)	21.7 (71.1)	17.9 (64.2)	14.3 (57.7)	18.9 (66.0)
Record low °C (°F)	4.5 (40.1)	5.5 (41.9)	5.2 (41.4)	10.7 (51.3)	15.2 (59.4)	17.8 (64.0)	22.9 (73.2)	24.7 (76.5)	20.3 (68.5)	15.8 (60.4)	11.3 (52.3)	8.3 (46.9)	4.5 (40.1)
Average rainfall mm (inches)	130.3 (5.13)	46.8 (1.84)	40.2 (1.58)	15.7 (0.62)	5.3 (0.21)	7.4 (0.29)	0.3 (0.01)	0.0 (0.0)	7.7 (0.30)	22.6 (0.89)	91.1 (3.59)	176.7 (6.96)	544.1 (21.42)
Source 1: National Observatory of Athens Monthly Bulletins (Sep 2018-Mar 2025)
Source 2: Kastellorizo N.O.A station and World Meteorological Organization

Climate data for Lindos 65 m a.s.l.
Month	Jan	Feb	Mar	Apr	May	Jun	Jul	Aug	Sep	Oct	Nov	Dec	Year
Record high °C (°F)	21.9 (71.4)	24.8 (76.6)	25.9 (78.6)	32.4 (90.3)	36.2 (97.2)	43.6 (110.5)	43.6 (110.5)	43.1 (109.6)	39.8 (103.6)	37.9 (100.2)	27.2 (81.0)	22.5 (72.5)	43.6 (110.5)
Mean daily maximum °C (°F)	16.4 (61.5)	16.9 (62.4)	18.6 (65.5)	22.5 (72.5)	26.9 (80.4)	31.8 (89.2)	35.5 (95.9)	35.0 (95.0)	31.6 (88.9)	26.7 (80.1)	22.0 (71.6)	18.3 (64.9)	25.2 (77.3)
Daily mean °C (°F)	13.8 (56.8)	14.2 (57.6)	15.7 (60.3)	19.1 (66.4)	23.2 (73.8)	27.9 (82.2)	31.5 (88.7)	31.4 (88.5)	28.2 (82.8)	23.7 (74.7)	19.4 (66.9)	15.8 (60.4)	22.0 (71.6)
Mean daily minimum °C (°F)	11.3 (52.3)	11.6 (52.9)	12.8 (55.0)	15.7 (60.3)	19.5 (67.1)	24.1 (75.4)	27.6 (81.7)	27.8 (82.0)	24.8 (76.6)	20.7 (69.3)	16.7 (62.1)	13.2 (55.8)	18.8 (65.9)
Record low °C (°F)	1.1 (34.0)	3.3 (37.9)	3.1 (37.6)	9.4 (48.9)	13.8 (56.8)	16.8 (62.2)	21.1 (70.0)	24.0 (75.2)	16.3 (61.3)	13.1 (55.6)	8.8 (47.8)	4.3 (39.7)	1.1 (34.0)
Average rainfall mm (inches)	107.2 (4.22)	74.5 (2.93)	45.1 (1.78)	10.8 (0.43)	11.0 (0.43)	2.5 (0.10)	1.4 (0.06)	0.04 (0.00)	6.1 (0.24)	22.5 (0.89)	77.0 (3.03)	123.9 (4.88)	482.04 (18.99)
Source 1: National Observatory of Athens (May 2014- Mar 2025)
Source 2: World Meteorological Organization

Climate data for Rhodes Airport (Integrated Maritsa and Paradeisi climate normals)
Month	Jan	Feb	Mar	Apr	May	Jun	Jul	Aug	Sep	Oct	Nov	Dec	Year
Record high °C (°F)	22.0 (71.6)	22.6 (72.7)	27.6 (81.7)	30.6 (87.1)	34.8 (94.6)	36.2 (97.2)	39.0 (102.2)	41.2 (106.2)	35.4 (95.7)	33.2 (91.8)	28.4 (83.1)	23.4 (74.1)	41.2 (106.2)
Mean daily maximum °C (°F)	15.1 (59.2)	15.2 (59.4)	17 (63)	20.0 (68.0)	24.1 (75.4)	28.3 (82.9)	30.4 (86.7)	30.7 (87.3)	28.1 (82.6)	24.5 (76.1)	20.2 (68.4)	16.7 (62.1)	22.5 (72.6)
Daily mean °C (°F)	12.0 (53.6)	12.0 (53.6)	13.5 (56.3)	16.3 (61.3)	20.0 (68.0)	24.2 (75.6)	26.4 (79.5)	26.7 (80.1)	24.4 (75.9)	20.7 (69.3)	16.7 (62.1)	13.5 (56.3)	18.9 (66.0)
Mean daily minimum °C (°F)	9.2 (48.6)	9.1 (48.4)	10.5 (50.9)	13 (55)	16.3 (61.3)	20.4 (68.7)	22.7 (72.9)	23.2 (73.8)	21 (70)	17.4 (63.3)	13.7 (56.7)	10.8 (51.4)	15.6 (60.1)
Record low °C (°F)	−4.0 (24.8)	−1.6 (29.1)	0.2 (32.4)	5.2 (41.4)	8.6 (47.5)	12.6 (54.7)	16.8 (62.2)	17.0 (62.6)	10.6 (51.1)	7.2 (45.0)	2.4 (36.3)	1.2 (34.2)	−4.0 (24.8)
Average rainfall mm (inches)	151.8 (5.98)	101.7 (4.00)	68.9 (2.71)	29.4 (1.16)	16.4 (0.65)	1.8 (0.07)	0.3 (0.01)	0.2 (0.01)	6.3 (0.25)	56.9 (2.24)	89.6 (3.53)	152.8 (6.02)	676.1 (26.63)
Average rainy days	15.5	12.7	10.5	7.6	4.6	1.2	0.2	0.1	1.5	6.7	9.5	15.4	85.5
Average relative humidity (%)	70.1	69.1	68.7	66.5	64.4	58.5	57.6	59.9	61.4	67.5	71.4	72.4	65.6
Mean daily sunshine hours	5.0	6.0	7.0	9.0	11.0	13.0	14.0	13.0	11.0	8.0	6.0	5.0	9.0
Source 1: Hellenic National Meteorological Service (1955–2010 averages)
Source 2: NOAA (1961–1977 temperatures taken from Maritsa Airport and 1977–1990 from Rhodes International Airport), Weather Atlas (sunshine data)

== History ==
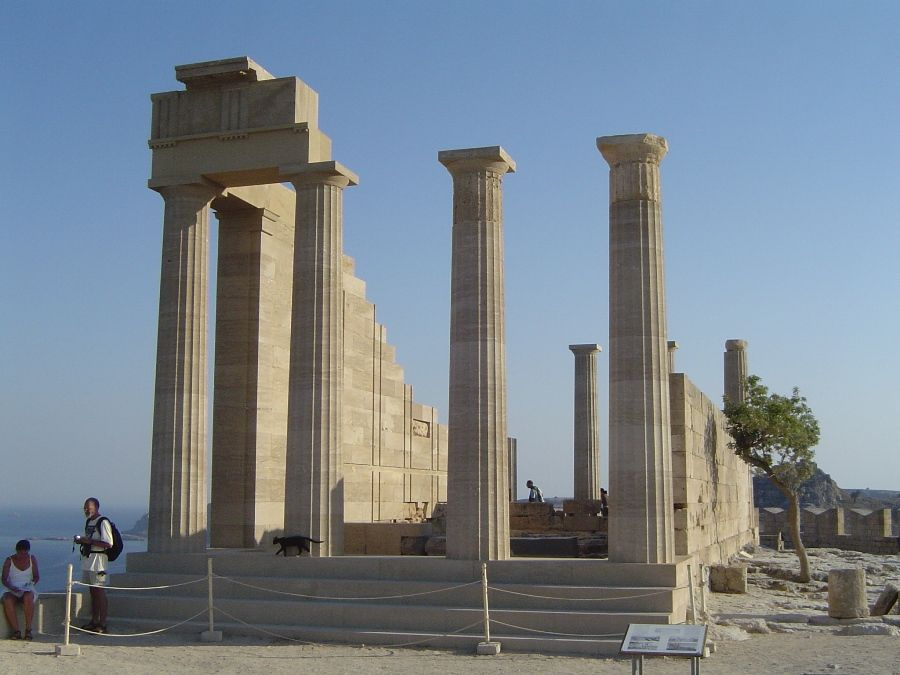
The Doric temple of Athena Lindia, Lindos

=== Pre-history and Archaic period ===
The Dodecanese have been inhabited since prehistoric times. In the Neopalatial period on Crete, the islands were heavily Minoanized (contact beginning in the second millennium BC). Following the downfall of the Minoans, the islands were ruled by the Mycenaean Greeks from circa 1400 BC, until the arrival of the Dorians circa 1100 BC. It is in the Dorian period that they began to prosper as an independent entity, developing a thriving economy and culture through the following centuries. By the early Archaic period Rhodes and Kos emerged as the major islands in the group, and in the 6th century BC the Dorians founded three major cities on Rhodes (Lindos, Kameiros and Ialyssos). Together with the island of Kos and the cities of Knidos and Halicarnassos on the mainland of Asia Minor, these made up the Dorian Hexapolis.

=== Classical and Hellenistic period ===
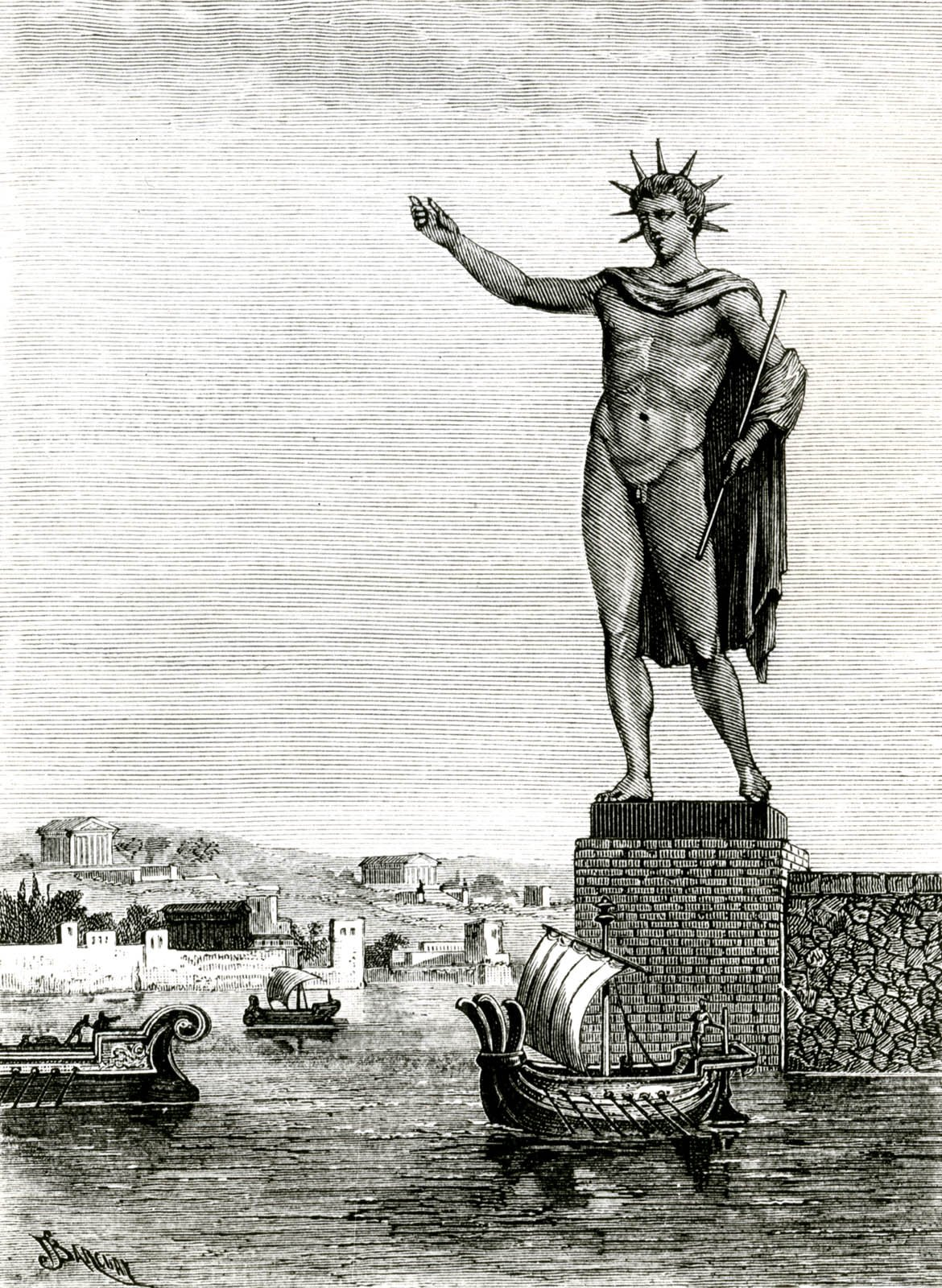
Colossus of Rhodes, one of the Seven Wonders of the Ancient World

This development was interrupted around 499 BC by the Persian Wars, during which the islands were captured by the Persians for a brief period. After the Athenians defeated the Persians in 478 BC, the cities joined the Athenian-dominated Delian League. When the Peloponnesian War broke out in 431 BC, they remained largely neutral, though they were still members of the League.

By the time the Peloponnesian War ended in 404 BC, the Dodecanese were mostly removed from the larger Aegean conflicts, and had begun a period of relative quiet and prosperity. In 408 BC, the three cities of Rhodes had united to form one state, which built a new capital on the northern end of the island, also named Rhodes; this united Rhodes dominated the region for the coming millennia. Other islands in the Dodecanese also developed into significant economic and cultural centers; most notably, Kos served as the site of the school of medicine founded by Hippocrates.

The Peloponnesian War had so weakened the entire Greek civilization's military strength that it lay open to invasion. In 357 BC, the islands were conquered by King Mausolus of Caria, then in 340 BC by the Persians. But this second period of Persian rule proved nearly as short as the first, and the islands became part of the rapidly growing Macedonian Empire as Alexander the Great swept through and defeated the Persians in 332 BC, to the great relief of the islands' inhabitants.

After Alexander's death, the islands, and even Rhodes itself, were split up among the many generals who contended to succeed him. Demetrius Poliorcetes failed to capture the city for the Antigonid empire after a long siege. The islands formed strong commercial ties with the Ptolemies in Egypt, and together they formed the Rhodo-Egyptian alliance, which controlled trade throughout the Aegean in the 3rd century BC. Led by Rhodes, the islands developed into maritime, commercial and cultural centers: coins of Rhodes circulated almost everywhere in the Mediterranean, and the islands' schools of philosophy, literature and rhetoric were famous. The Colossus of Rhodes, built in 304 BC, perhaps best symbolized their wealth and power.

Rhodes allied with Rome and Pergamum against Philip V of Macedon and Antiochus the Great. It reached its maximum territorial extent after the Roman-Seleucid War and the following Treaty of Apamea. In 164 BC, Rhodes signed a treaty with Rome, and the islands became aligned to greater or lesser extent with the Roman Republic while mostly maintaining their autonomy. Rhodes quickly became a major schooling center for Roman noble families, and, as the islands (and particularly Rhodes) were important allies of Rome, they enjoyed numerous privileges and generally friendly relations. These were eventually lost in 42 BC, in the turmoil following the assassination of Julius Caesar in 44 BC, after which Cassius invaded and sacked the islands. Thereafter, they became part of the Roman Empire proper. Titus made Rhodes capital of the Provincia Insularum, and eventually the islands were joined with Crete as part of the 18th Province of the Roman Empire.

In the 1st century, Saint Paul visited the islands twice, and Saint John visited numerous times; they succeeded in converting the islands to Christianity, placing them among the first dominantly Christian regions. Saint John eventually came to reside among them, being exiled to Patmos, where he wrote his famous Revelation.

=== Middle Ages ===
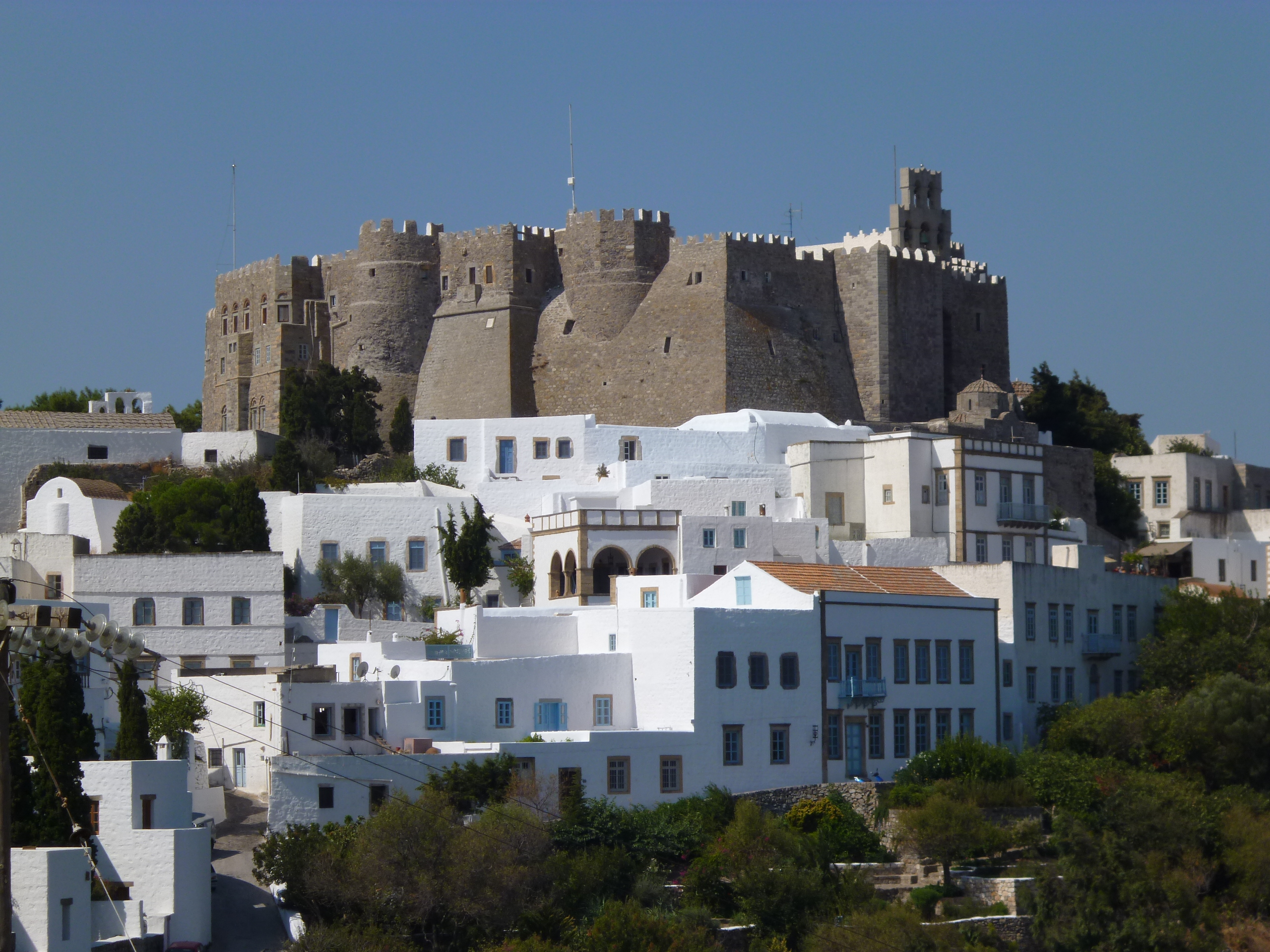
Monastery of Saint John the Theologian, Patmos

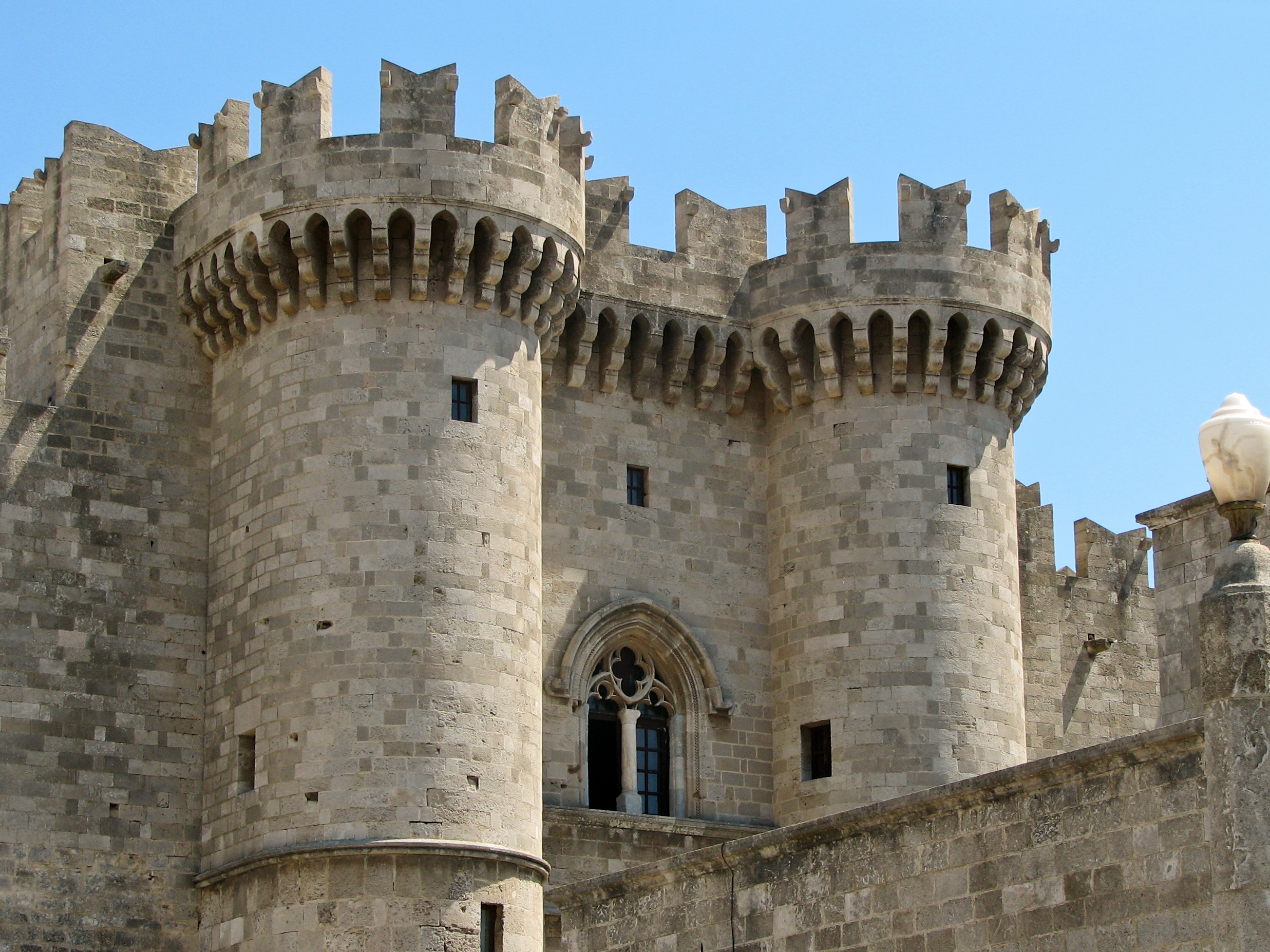
Palace of the Grand Master of the Knights of Rhodes

As the Roman Empire split in AD 395 into Eastern and Western halves, the islands became part of the Eastern part, which later evolved into the Byzantine Empire. They would remain there for nearly a thousand years, though these were punctuated by numerous invasions. It was during this period that they began to reemerge as an independent entity, and the term Dodecanese itself dates to around the 8th century. Copious evidence of the Eastern Roman period remains on the islands today, most notably in hundreds of churches from the period in various states of preservation.

In the 10th and 11th centuries, on behalf the Roman Empire of Constantinople, the area was controlled and secured with trade duty rights by powerful maritime city-state fleets of Genoa (with the clan of Vignolo de'Vignoli) and Venice (with the clan of Cornaros); When the Genoese snatched a treaty from the Paleologos Emperors of Constantinople, they began invading portions of the Dodecanese and other eastern isles from Chios to Rhodes that had remained under the nominal power of the Empire of Nicea; Genoese family clans (Moresco, Vignoli, Giustiniani, Spinola and others) each held some islands and were granted rights to rule, trade and to exploit raw materials (masticha, etc.), in exchange for maritime protection, while Orthodox monks ruled on Patmos and Leros. The Byzantine era came to an end when the islands were rented and sold by Genoeses for the venue of the Knights Hospitaller (Knights of St John): Rhodes was reinforced in 1309, and in the rest of the islands the Knights gradually built castles and fortress over the next few decades, while the Genoese fleet remained in charge of the sea routes and kept its bases and trading stores (Empori). The Knights made Rhodes their stronghold, transforming its capital into a grandiose medieval city dominated by an impressive fortress, with scattered other fortresses and citadels throughout the rest of the islands.

These massive fortifications proved sufficient to repel invasions by the Sultan of Egypt in 1444 and Mehmed II in 1480. Finally, the citadel at Rhodes fell to the army of Suleiman the Magnificent in 1522, and the other islands were overrun within the year. The few remaining Knights fled to Malta.

=== Ottoman rule ===
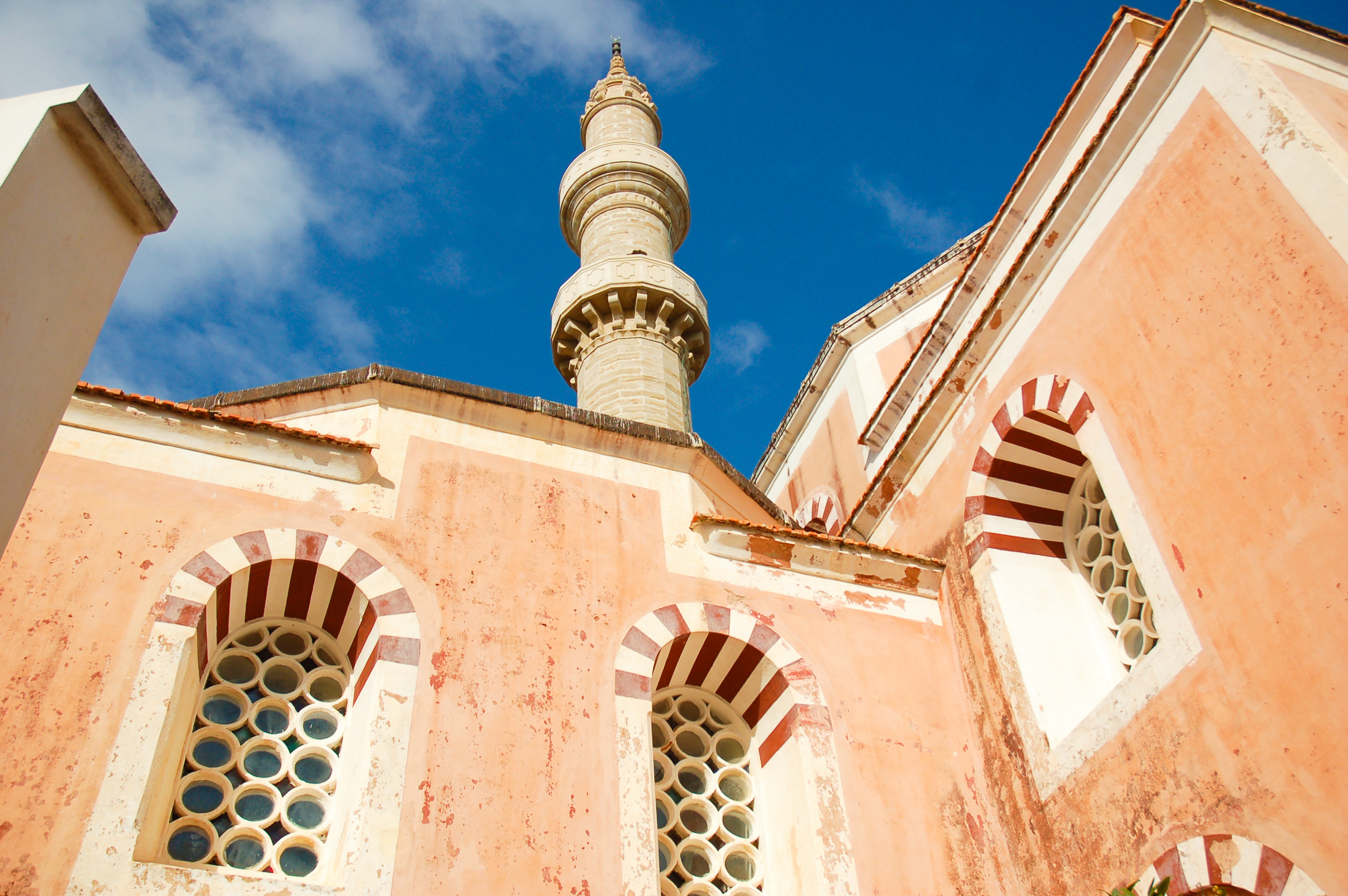
Suleiman mosque (view from below), Rhodes

Thus began a period of several hundred years in the Ottoman Empire. The Dodecanese formed a separate province within the Eyalet of the Archipelago. The population was allowed to retain a number of privileges provided it submitted to Ottoman rule. By Suleiman's edict, they paid a special tax in return for a special autonomous status that prohibited Ottoman generals from interfering in their civil affairs or mistreating the population. These guarantees, combined with a strategic location at the crossroads of Mediterranean shipping, allowed the islands to prosper. The overwhelmingly Greek population (only Rhodes and Kos had Turkish communities) leaned heavily toward Greece following its declaration of independence in 1822, and many of the islanders joined the Greek War of Independence, with the result that the northern portion of the Dodecanese (including Samos) became briefly the Greek provinces of the Eastern Sporades and Southern Sporades. Kasos in particular played a prominent role due to its skilled mariners, until its destruction by the Egyptians in 1824. Most of the islands were slated to become part of the new Greek state in the London Protocol of 1828, but when Greek independence was recognized in the London Protocol of 1830, the islands were left outside the new Kingdom of Greece. The 19th century turned out to be one of the islands' most prosperous, and a number of mansions date from this era.

==== Turks of the Dodecanese ====
A Turkish Muslim minority lives in Rhodes and Kos. Sources have variously estimated the Turkish population of Kos and Rhodes to be 5,000, 6,000, or 7,000.

=== Italian rule ===
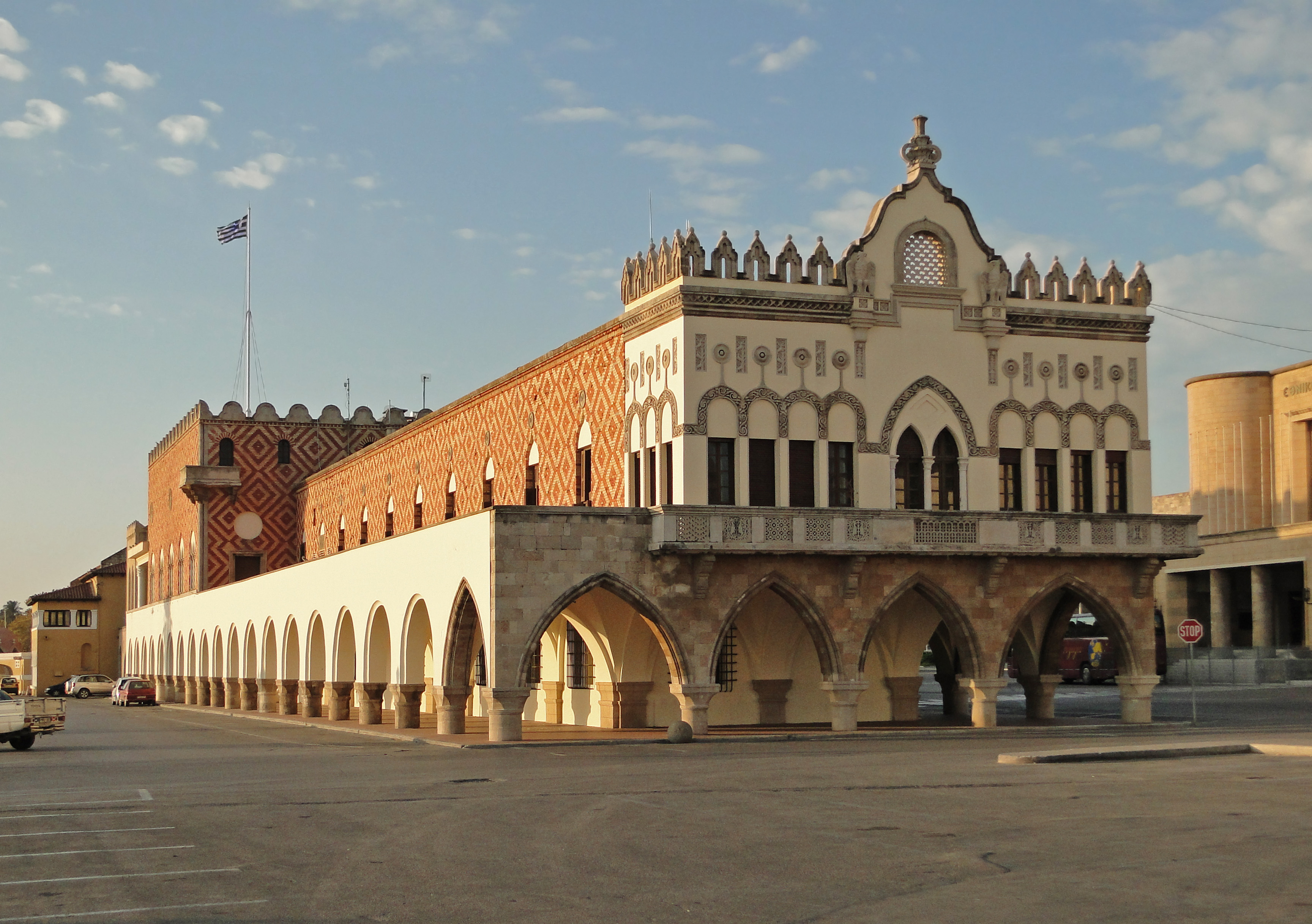
Palazzo del Governo in Rhodes, now the Prefecture of the Dodecanese

After the outbreak of the Italian-Turkish war over Libya in early 1912, Italy, in order to apply pressure on the Ottoman government closer to its metropolitan territories, occupied all the present-day Dodecanese except for Kastellorizo.

After the end of the war according to the Treaty of Ouchy, Italy maintained the occupation of the islands as guarantee for the execution of the treaty. The occupation continued after Italy declared war on the Ottoman Empire (21 August 1915) during World War I.

During the war, the islands became an important naval base for Britain and France; Italy was allied with both nations. The Dodecanese were used as a staging area for numerous campaigns, most famously the one at Gallipoli. The French and British occupied some of the smaller islands, but Rhodes remained under Italian occupation. In 1915, the French also occupied Kastellorizo.

After the war, the Tittoni–Venizelos agreement, signed on 29 July 1919, called for the smaller islands to join with Greece while Italy maintained control of Rhodes. The treaty further outlined an exchange where Italy would receive Antalya for southwest Anatolia. The Greek defeat in the Greco-Turkish War and the foundation of modern Turkey prevented the exchange. Italy formally annexed the Dodecanese as the Possedimenti Italiani dell'Egeo under the terms of the Treaty of Lausanne. Mussolini embarked on a program of Italianization, hoping to make Rhodes a modern transportation hub that would serve as a focal point for the spread of Italian culture in the Levant. The islands were overwhelmingly Greek-speaking, with a Turkish-speaking minority and a smaller Ladino-speaking Jewish minority. Immigrant Italian speakers were a marginal language community.

Although the Italian state placed the islands under the direction of the Ministry of Foreign Affairs, their governance was strongly tied to the project for an Italian empire in the Mediterranean and to the Italian colonies in Libya, Somalia, Eritrea, and after 1936, in Ethiopia.

As part of securing sovereignty in the islands, Italy created and applied a form of imperial citizenship for the local population unique to its overseas empire. Called Italian Aegean citizenship (cittadinanza egea italiana), this form of citizenship was inclusive of local political rights and exclusive of military service. After 1934, Dodecanese citizens could complete military service and apply to become full Italian citizens, an option many locals chose while supporting Italian Fascism and seeing the Italian empire as promoting their financial well-being. Italian Aegean citizenship also ensured the islands were exempted from the exchange of Greek and Turkish minority populations in the Aegean, a provision of the Second Lausanne Treaty that ended the Greco-Turkish War. After 1934, it was also possible to acquire Italian Aegean citizenship from abroad and to transmit Italian Aegean citizenship on the principle of patrilineal descent. This reform mirrored the principle of jus sanguinis which provides the basis of Italian citizenship and was especially intended for the large Greek-speaking Dodecanese-origin emigrant community in Egypt.

The Fascist administration sought to modernize the islands, eradicating malaria, constructing hospitals, aqueducts, a power plant to provide Rhodes' capital with electric lighting, and establishing the Dodecanese cadastre. The main castle of the Knights of St. John was also rebuilt. The concrete-dominated Fascist architectural style detracted significantly from the islands' picturesque scenery (and also reminded the inhabitants of Italian rule), and has consequently been largely demolished or remodeled, apart from the famous example of the Leros town of Lakki, which remains a prime example of the architecture.

From 1936 to 1940 Cesare Maria De Vecchi acted as governor of the Italian Islands of the Aegean, promoting the official use of the Italian language and favoring a process of Italianization, interrupted by the beginning of World War II. In the 1936 Italian census of the Dodecanese islands, the total population was 129,135, of whom 7,015 were Italians.

=== World War II ===
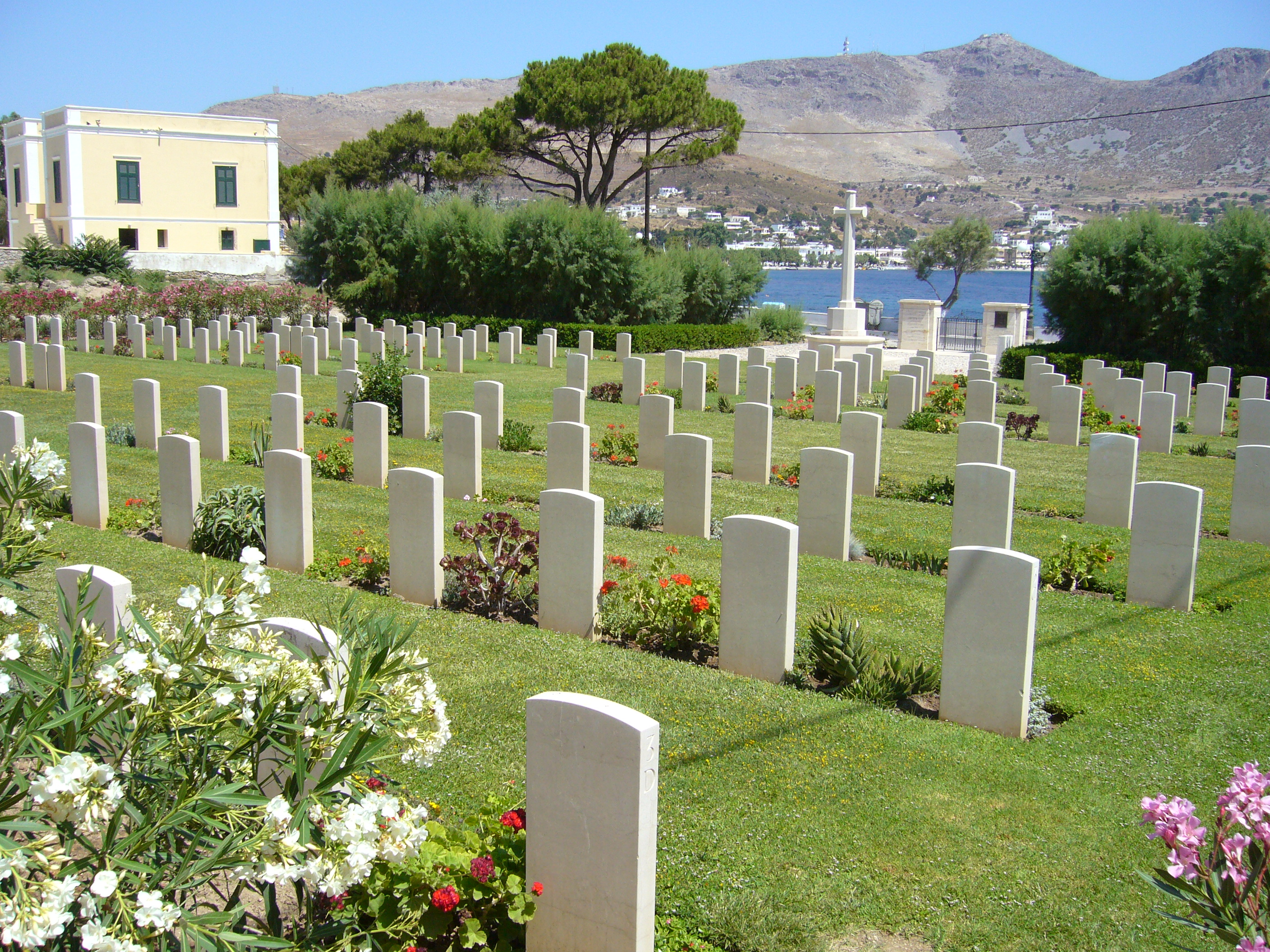
WWII cemetery in Leros

During World War II, Italy joined the Axis powers, which used the Dodecanese as a naval staging area for their invasion of Crete in 1941. After Italy surrendered in September 1943, the islands briefly became a battleground between the Germans and Allied forces, including the Italians. The Germans prevailed in the Dodecanese Campaign, and although they were driven out of mainland Greece in 1944, the Dodecanese remained occupied until the end of the war in 1945, during which time nearly the entire Jewish population of 6,000 was deported and killed. Only 1,200 of these Ladino-speaking Jews survived by escaping to the nearby coast of Turkey. On 8 May 1945 the German garrison commander Otto Wagener surrendered the islands to the British on Rhodes, handing over 5,000 German and 600 Italian military personnel.

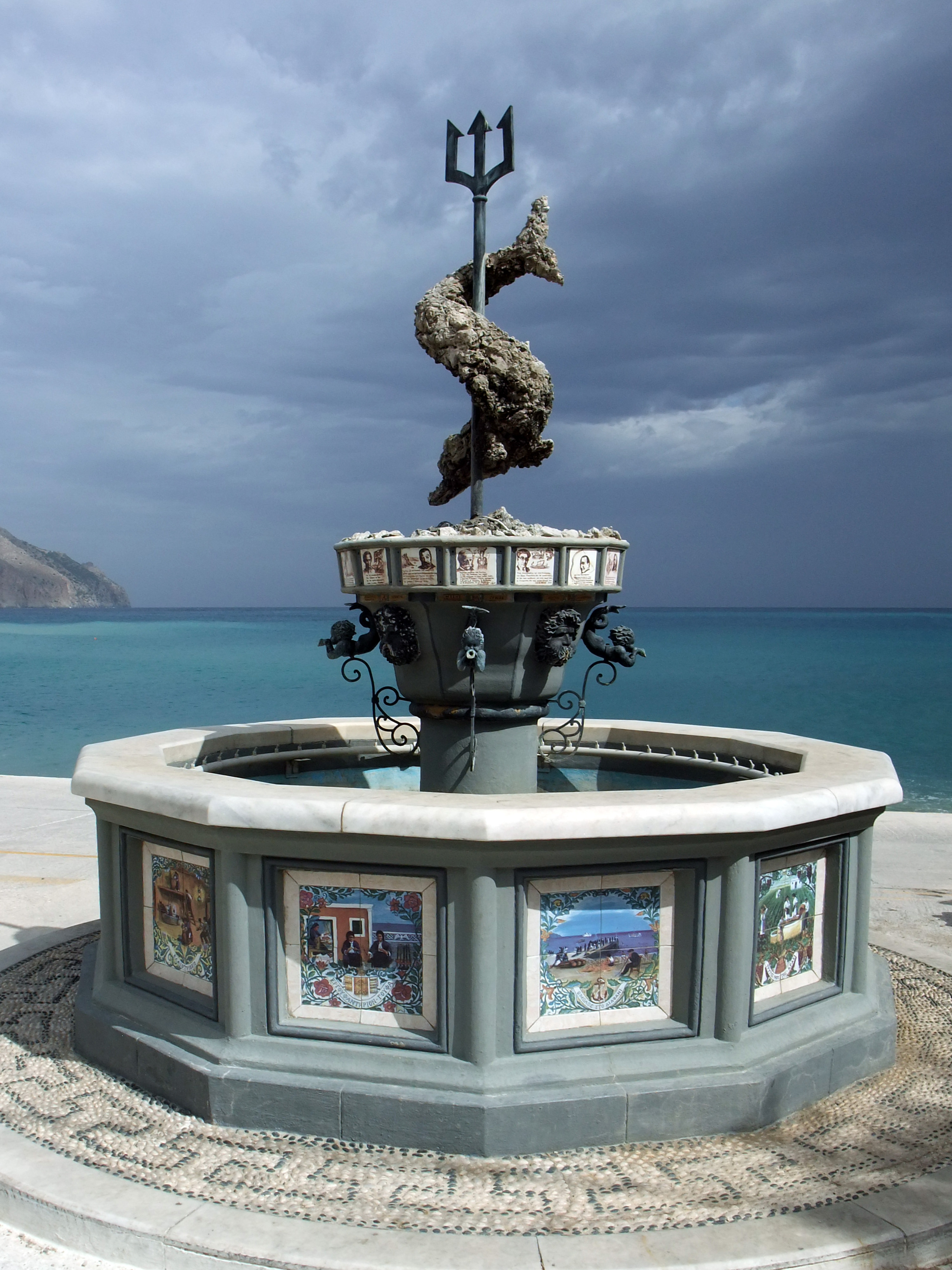
Modern fountain of Neptune in Diafáni, Karpathos

=== Post-World War II ===
After the war, the islands became a British military protectorate and were almost immediately allowed to run their own civil affairs, whereupon they became informally united with Greece, though under separate sovereignty and military control. Despite objections from Turkey, which desired the islands as well, they were formally united with Greece by the 1947 Peace Treaty with Italy.

As a legacy of its former status as a jurisdiction separate from Greece, it is still considered a separate "entity" for amateur radio purposes, essentially maintaining its status as an independent country "on the air." Amateur radio call signs in the Dodecanese begin with the prefix SV5 instead of SV for Greece.

The 70th anniversary of the Dodecanese enosis was marked in 2017, with the Greek Parliament holding a special celebratory session for the event.

Today, Rhodes and the Dodecanese are popular travel destinations.

== Administration ==
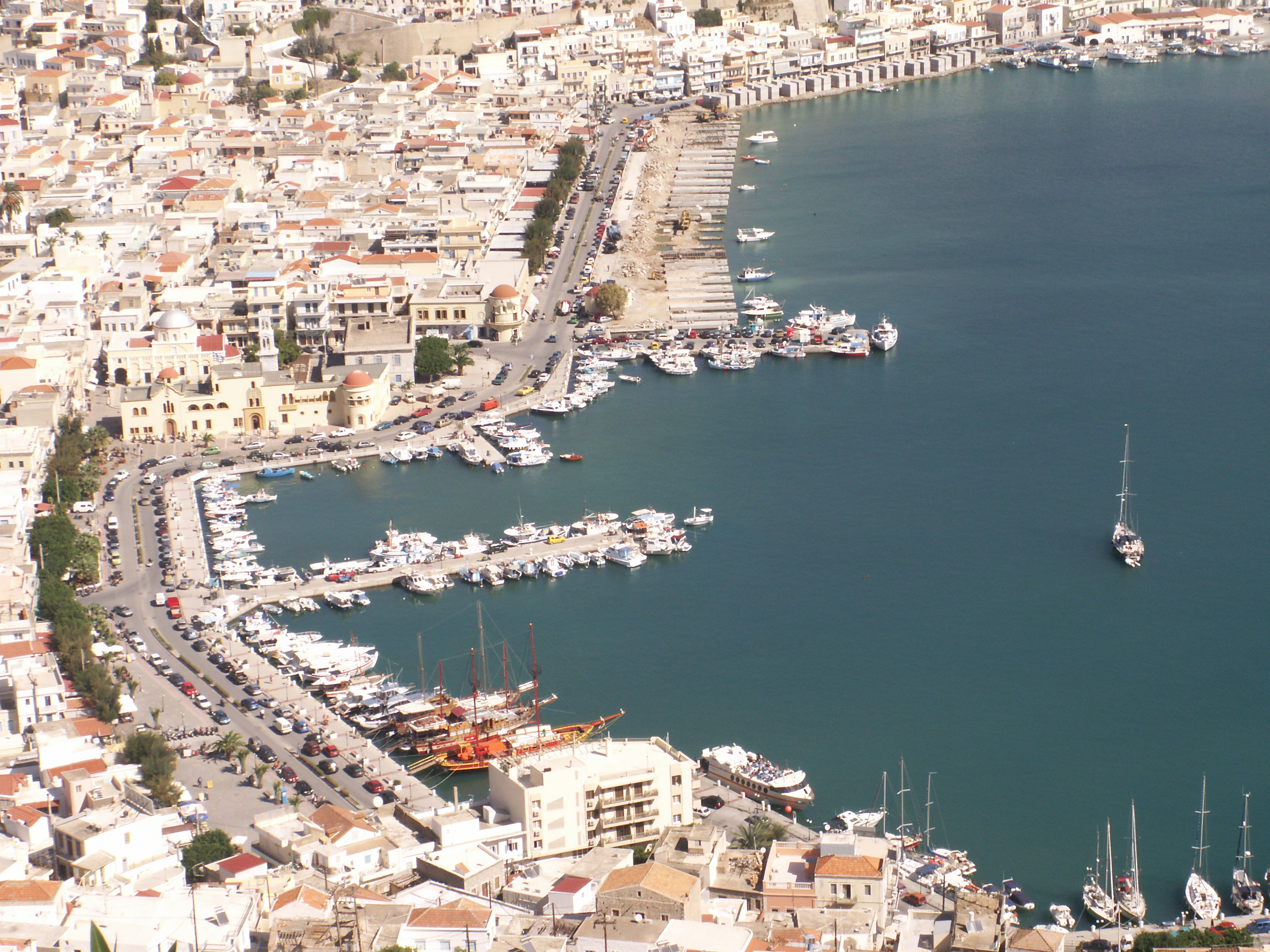
Kalymnos

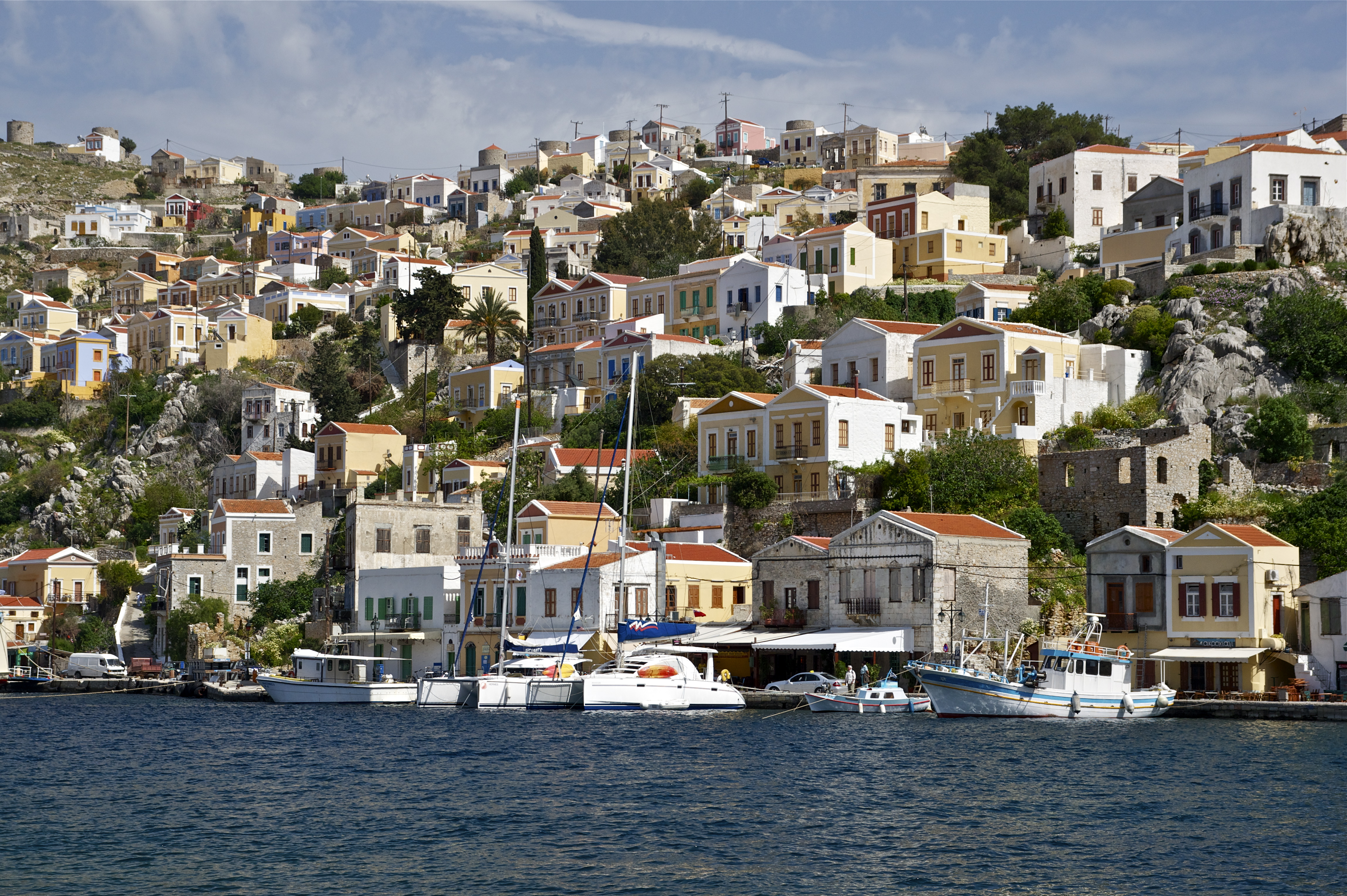
Symi

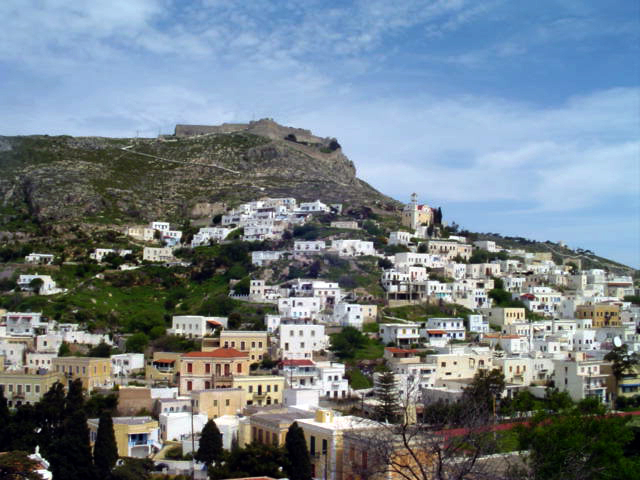
Leros

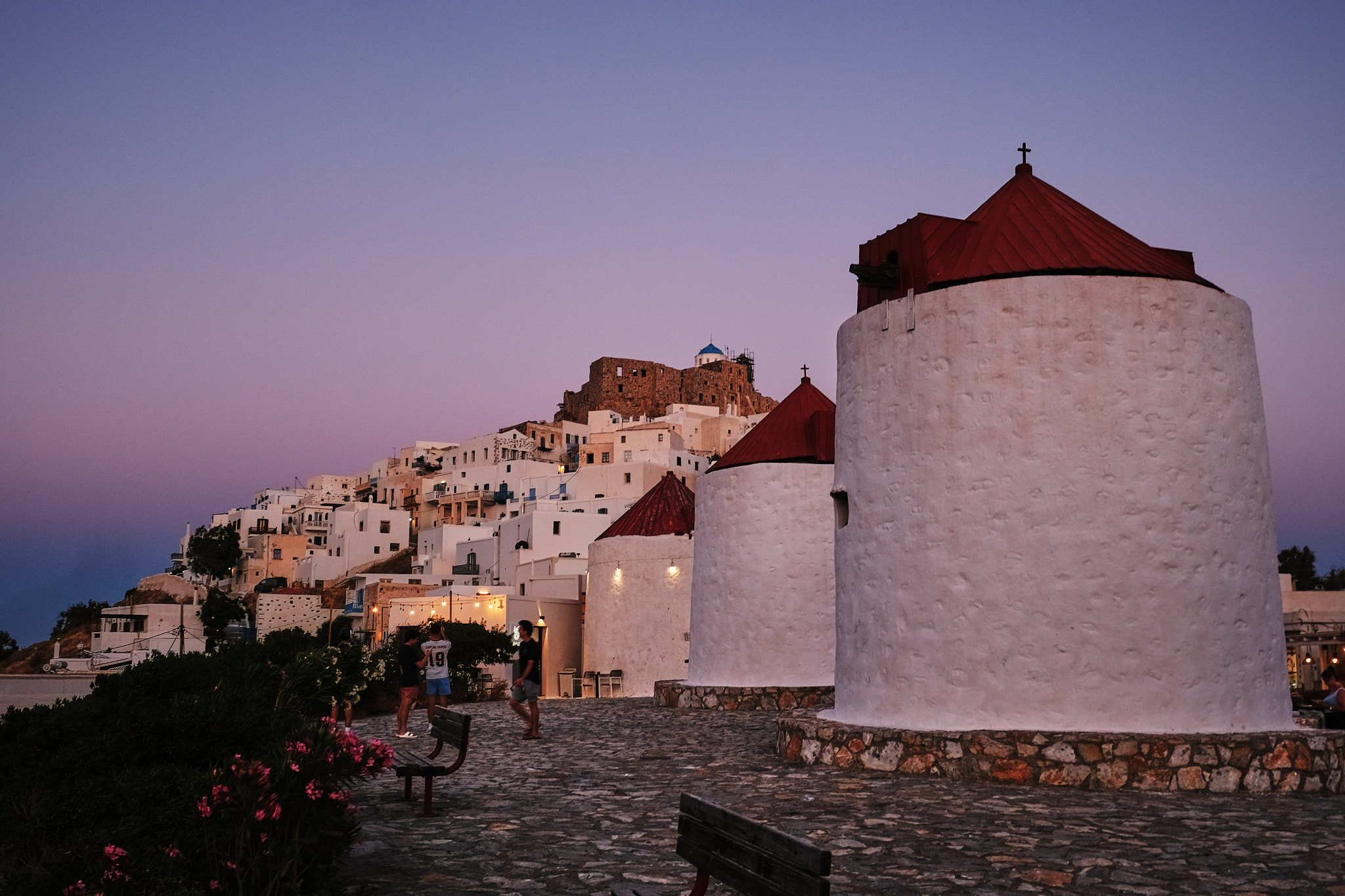
Astypalea

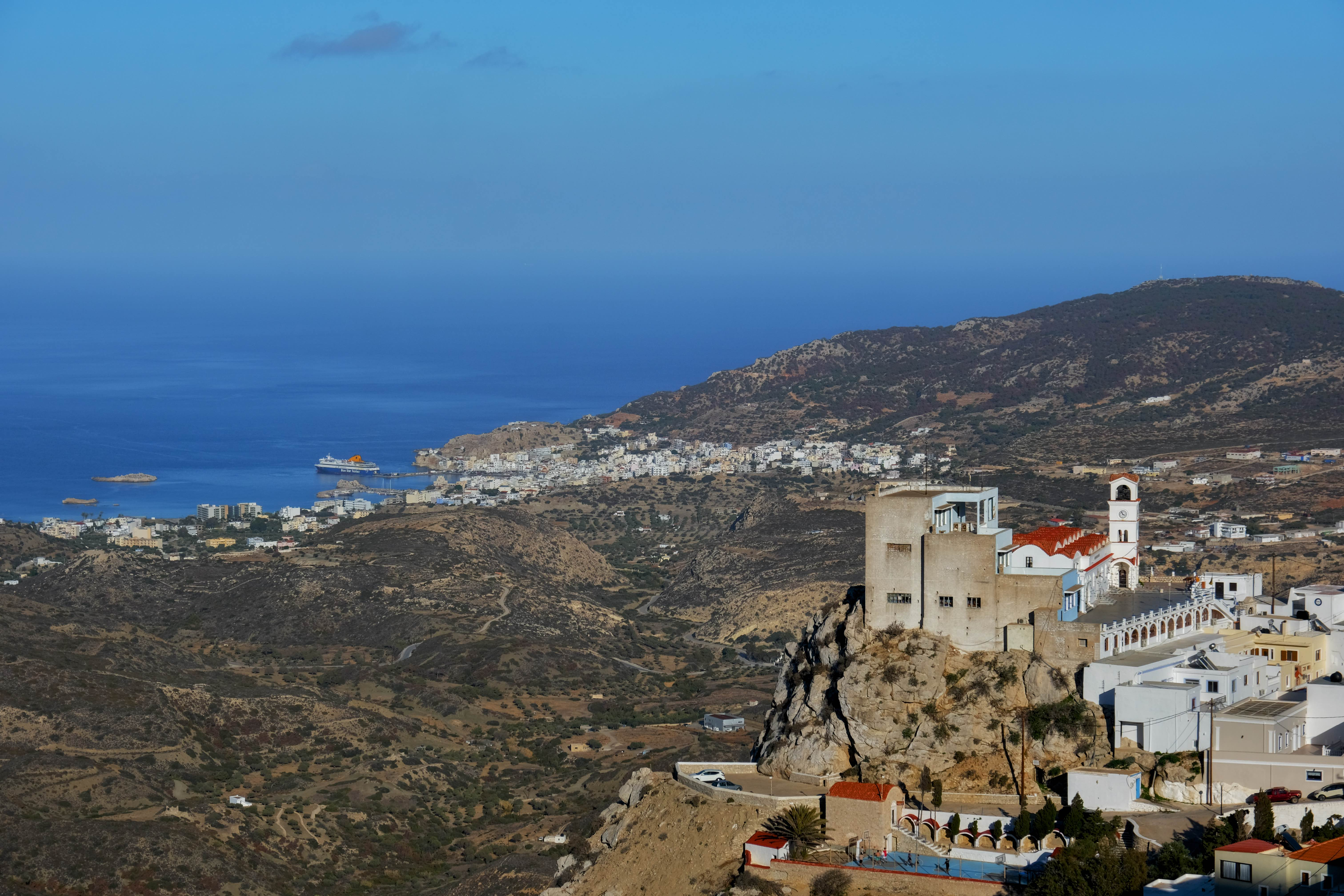
Karpathos

The Dodecanese Prefecture was one of the prefectures of Greece. As a part of the 2011 Kallikratis reform, the prefecture was abolished, and its territory was divided into four regional units, within the South Aegean administrative region:

- Kalymnos
- Karpathos-Kasos
- Kos
- Rhodes

=== Municipalities and communities ===
The prefecture was subdivided into the following municipalities and communities. These have been reorganised at the 2011 Kallikratis reform as well.

Municipality	YPES code	Seat (if different)	Postal code	Area code
Afantou	1205		851 03	22410-50 through 53, 56, 57
Archangelos	1202		851 02	22440-2
Astypalaia	1203		859 00	22430-4
Attavyros	1204	Empona	851 09	22460-5
Chalki	1227		851 10	22460-45
Dikaio	1206	Zipari	853 00	
Ialysos	1208		851 01	22410-90 through 98
Irakleides	1207	Antimacheia	853 02	22420-6
Kallithea	1209	Kalythies	851 05	22410–6, 84 through 87
Kalymnos	1210		852 00	22430–2, 50, 59
Kameiros	1211	Soroni	851 06	22410-40 through 42
Karpathos	1212		857 00	22450–2, 3
Kasos	1213		858 00	22450-4
Kos	1214		853 00	22420-2
Lipsi	1215		850 01	22470-4
Leros	1216		854 00	22470-2
Lindos	1217		851 07	22440–2,3
Megisti/Kastellorizo	1218		851 11	22460-49
Nisyros	1219		853 03	22420-3
Patmos	1222		855 00	22470-3
Petaloudes	1223	Kremasti	851 04	22410-90 through 98
Rhodes	1224		851 00	22410–2,3,4,6,7,8
South Rhodes	1220	Gennadi	851 09	22440-4
Symi	1225		856 00	22460-70 through 72
Tilos	1226		850 02	22460-44
Community	YPES code	Seat (if different)	Postal code	Area code
Agathonisi	1201	Agathonissi	850 01	22470
Olympos	1221		857 00	22450

=== Provinces ===
Until 1997, the Prefecture of the Dodecanese was subdivided into provinces:

- Province of Patmos – Patmos
- Province of Kalymnos – Kalymnos
- Province of Kos – Kos
- Province of Rhodes – Rhodes City
- Province of Karpathos & Kasos – Karpathos

== Cuisine ==
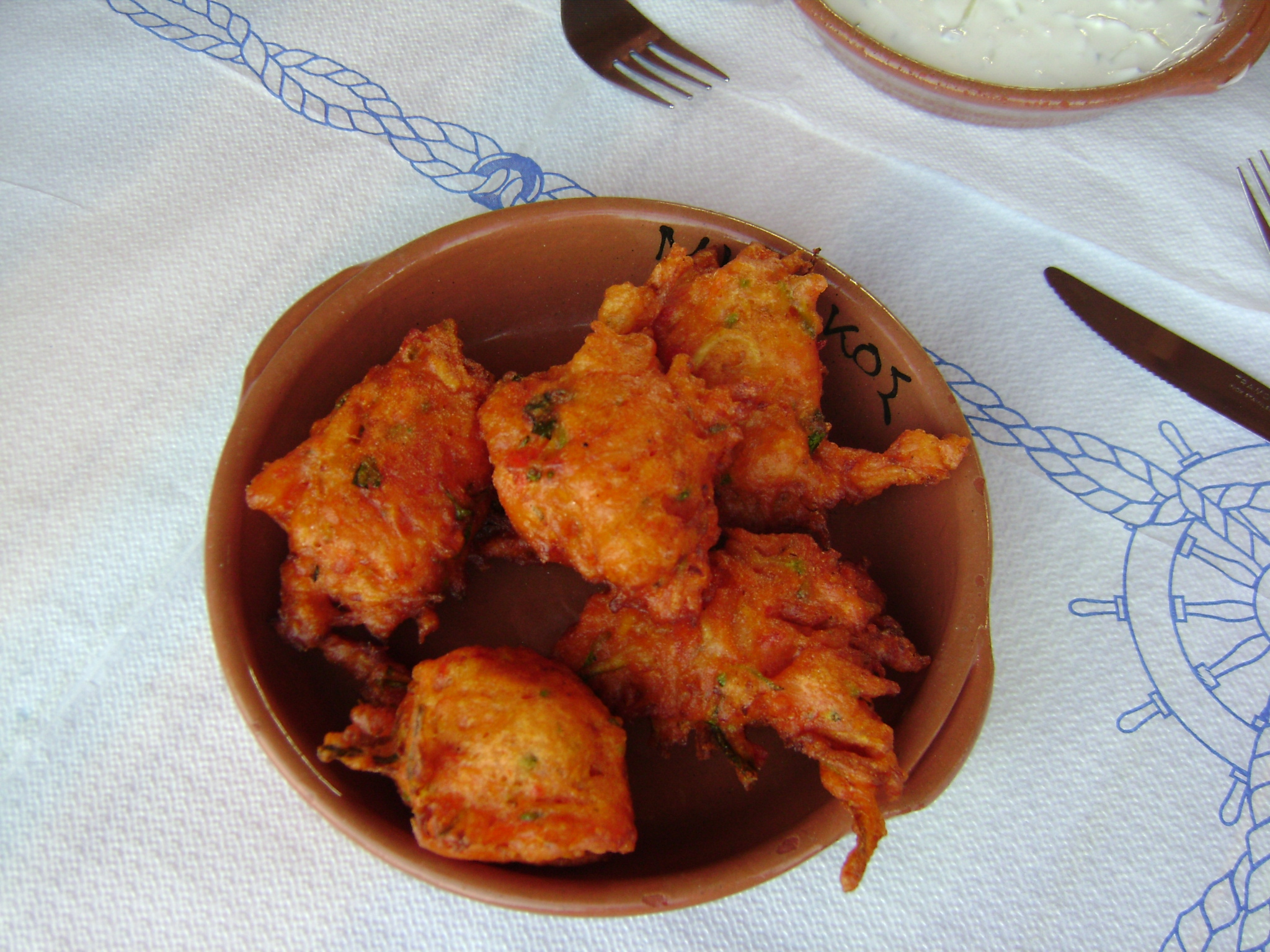
Pitaroudia, traditional food from Dodecanese.

Local specialities of the Dodecanese include:

- Avranies
- Koulouria (Κουλουρία)
- Pitaroudia
- Pouggia (Πουγγιά)
- Tsirigia
- Fanouropita (dessert)
- Katimeria (dessert)
- Melekouni (dessert)
- Pouggakia (dessert)
- Takakia or Mantinades (dessert)

== See also ==
- List of settlements in the Dodecanese
- List of islands of Greece

== Sources ==
- Ahrweiler, Hélène (1966). Byzance et la mer. La marine de guerre, la politique et les institutions maritimes de Byzance aux VIIe- XVe siècles (in French). Paris: Presses universitaires de France.
- Giannopoulos, Giannis (2006). "Δωδεκάνησος, η γένεση ενός ονόματος και η αντιμετώπισή του από τους Ιταλούς" [Dodecanese, the genesis of a name and the Italian approach]. Ἑῶα καὶ Ἑσπέρια (in Greek). 6: 275–296. doi:10.12681/eoaesperia.78. ISSN 2241-7540.
- McGuire, Valerie (2020). Italy's Sea: Empire and Nation in the Mediterranean, 1895-1945. Liverpool: Liverpool University Press.
