= Eilean Dubh =

Eilean Dubh (Scottish Gaelic, 'Black Island') may refer to:

- List of islands called Eilean Dubh
- Eilean Dubh (ferry)

== See also ==
- Black Island (disambiguation)
- Black Isle (Scottish Gaelic: an t-Eilean Dubh)
