= Eşek Island =

Uninhabited island to the north of Çeşme in İzmir Province of Turkey

Native name: Eşek Ada, Kara Ada Goni Adasi Nickname: Donkey Island (tourists)
- Marked as "Kara" island on the east side of the Chios Strait.

- Location within Turkey

Geography
- Location: Aegean Sea
- Coordinates: 38°26′28.1112″N 26°20′57.3252″E

Administration
- Turkey
- İl (province): İzmir Province

Eşek Island (Turkish: Eşek Adası), also known as Kara Island (Turkish: Karaada or Kara Ada, meaning Black Island), Goni Adasi or Donkey Island, is an island to the north of Çeşme in İzmir Province of Turkey. Located on the east side of the Chios Strait opposite the Greek island of Chios, it is the largest of a group of uninhabited islands sitting at the mouth of the Ildır bay which is situated between the Çeşme and Karaburun peninsulas.

The island is a popular day trip destination by boat from Çeşme, and known for its donkeys, which are popular with local and foreign tourists. "Eşek" means donkey, or ass, in Turkish, and the donkeys are the source of the current popular name for the island. The government has improved the conditions of the donkey population (which exists because of a few animals left abandoned on the island previously), providing them with fresh water and shelter from the sun. Electricity to draw and treat water comes from solar panels and wind turbines.

The island has a total area of 670 hectares and highest elevation of 218 meters. Two smaller islands lie directly east of the island, known as Kucuk Ada, and Toprak Ada, and a few even smaller islands including Uzunada are also in close proximity. The nearest part of the mainland lies to the east of the island, which is a small peninsula jutting out of Karaburun peninsula known as Colak Burnu, and which features the promontory of Teke Dagi which reaches 312 meters in height.

== Other islands ==
The island should not be confused with the Greek island of Agathonisi to the south off the coast of Didim, Turkey, which is also called "Eşek Adasi" in Turkish, or other Turkish islands also referred to "Kara Ada", including one near Bodrum.
