= Lepsia =

Coordinates: 37°17′11″N 26°46′32″E

Lepsia (Ancient Greek: Λέψια) was a town of ancient Greece on the island of same name).

Its site is located near modern Leipsoi.
