= Kara Ada =

Kara Ada or Karaada, literally "Black Island", may refer to:

- Kara Ada (Bodrum), an island near Bodrum, Muğla province
- Kara Ada (Rabbit islands), an island in Çanakkale province
- Kara Ada (Izmir), an island west of Izmir in Çeşme district
- Karaada (Meis), a Greek islet near Kastelorizo
