= Black Island (Calamian Group) =

Island in the Philippines

Coordinates: 12°9′11″N 119°48′57″E

Black Island, also known as Malajon Island, is one of the many islands that belong to the Calamian Islands group in Palawan, Philippines. It is part of the municipality of Busuanga in the province of Palawan. The island is a tourist spot that features caves and various shipwrecks.

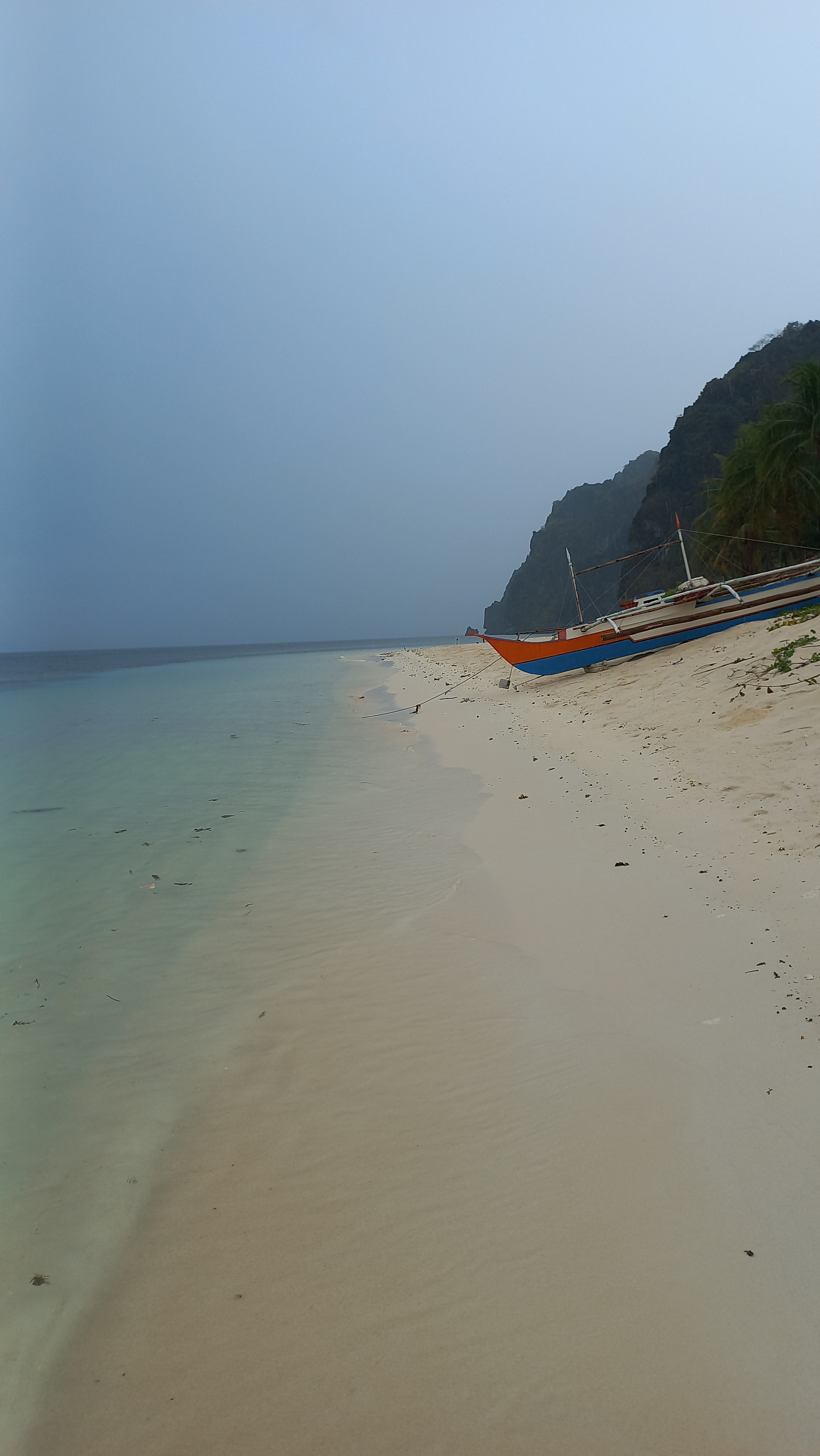
White sand beach of Malajon Island

== Transportation ==
To get to the island, one has to ride by boat from any point in the main island of Busuanga.

== See also ==
- List of islands of the Philippines
