= Agathonisi =

Greek island in the Aegean Sea

Agathonisi Αγαθονήσι
- Municipality
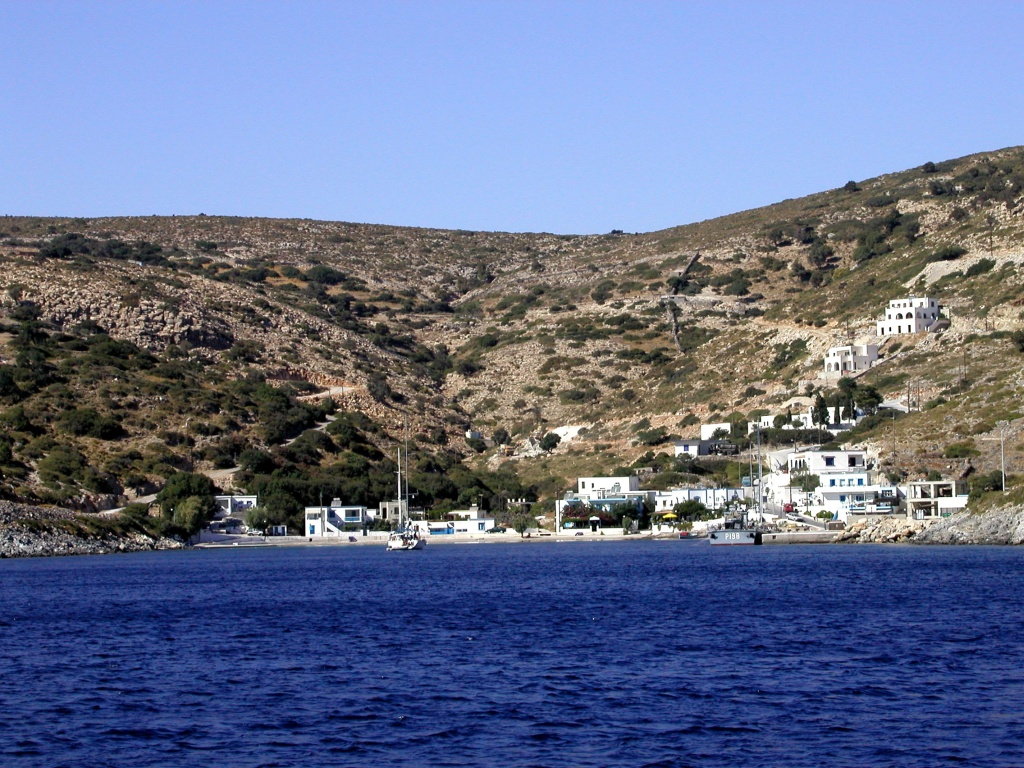
- Agathonisi, with the small harbor of Agios Georgios

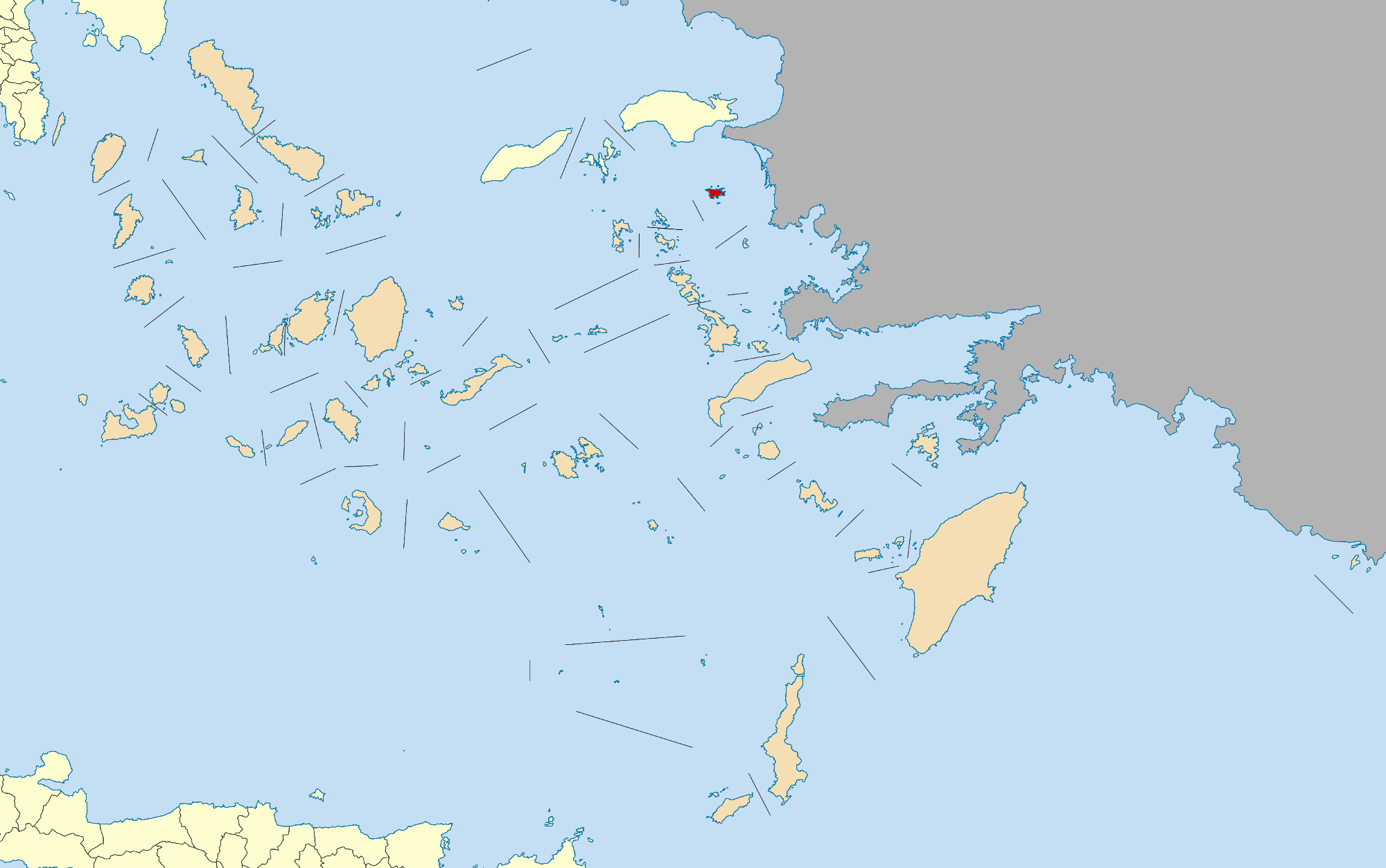

- Location within Greece
- Coordinates: 37°27.5′N 26°58′E
- Country: Greece
- Administrative region: South Aegean
- Regional unit: Kalymnos

Area
  - Municipality: 14.5 km^{2} (5.6 sq mi)

Population (2021)
  - Municipality: 202
  - Density: 13.9/km^{2} (36.1/sq mi)
- Time zone: UTC+2 (EET)
  - Summer (DST): UTC+3 (EEST)

Agathonísi (Greek: Αγαθονήσι) is a small Greek island and municipality located at the northernmost point of the Dodecanese in Greece. It is surrounded by many smaller islands and is home to two villages, both inland; Megalo Chorio ("Big Village"), and Mikro Chorio ("Small Village"). Between them is the small settlement of Agios Georgios (Saint George), which forms the island's only harbor and consists of a few hotels and restaurants. The island is also locally known as Gaidaro ("Donkey"), or by its ancient name Tragea.

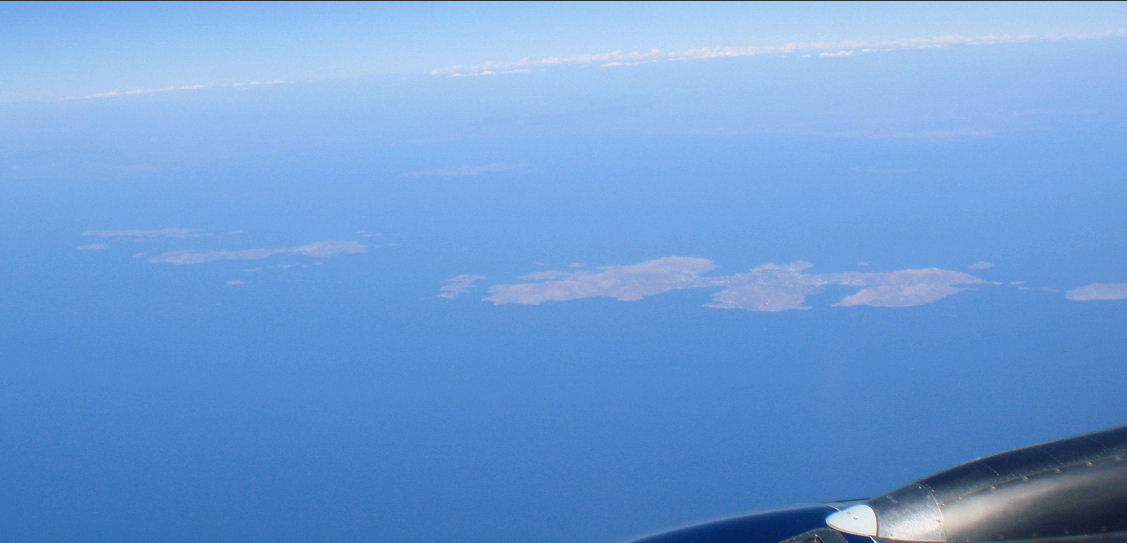
Front, left to right: Arkoi, Leipsoi, Leros. Back, left to right: Agathonisi, Farmakonisi and the Turkish coastline.

The highest point on the island is 209 metres (686 feet) above sea level. This peak is located close to Mikro Chorio. The island covers an area of 13.5 square kilometres (5.2 square miles). It is made almost entirely of subcrystalline stratified limestones, and is covered with thorny macchia.

In the late 1920s the island had 80 inhabitants, active in agriculture and sheep rearing. A census of the island in 1981 showed that it was populated by 133 people. The 1991 census showed that the population had dropped to 112. By the 2001 census the population had again risen to 158 residents, and in 2011 its population was 185, 168 of whom lived in Megalo Chorio, and only 17 in Mikro Chorio. The municipality of Agathonisi, which includes the uninhabited offshore islets of Glaros, Kouneli, Nera, and Psathonisio, has a combined land area of 14,500 square kilometres (5,598.481 square miles).

== Name ==
In ancient times, Agathonisi was known as Psetoussa (Ancient Greek: Ψετούσσα). Ancient writers varied in recording its name: Tragia (Τραγία), Tragiae or Tragiai (Τραγίαι), Tragaeae or Tragaiai (Τραγαῖαι), and Tragaea or Tragaia (Τραγαία) are among the forms recorded. The island is known as Gaidaro in Italian and as Eşek Adası in Turkish.

== History ==
Near the island, Pericles defeated the Samians in a naval engagement in 440 BCE. In modern times, the island (dependent on Patmos) was occupied in 1912 by the Kingdom of Italy during the Italo-Turkish War and, after being part of the Italian Islands of the Aegean (of which it was the northernmost islet), was ceded from Italy to Greece in 1947 with the Treaty of Peace.

== Administration ==
In 2011, as part of the Kallikratis Plan, the island's status was upgraded from Community to Municipality.

== Archipelago of Agathonisi ==
Near Agathonisi lie several islets: Psatonisi, Strongili, Neronisi, Katagani, all made with crystalline limestones, and Kunellonisi, which is made of schistose-crystalline rocks.

== Election results ==
Election	Turnout	ND	PASOK	SYRIZA	KKE	Other
Jun 2023	45.73	49.62	16.03	16.03	3.82	14.50 (Note: Spartiates 3.82 PE 2.29 Niki 1.53 Μ25 1.53 EY 1.53 Other 3.80)
May 2023	52.17	52.17	16.67	20.29	4.35	6.52 (Note: EL 1.45 PE 1.45 ED 1.45 Other 2.17)
2019	54.72	50.00	8.57	26.43	1.43	13.57 (Note: XA 5.00 EPAM–AKKEL 3.57 EL 2.86 Μ25 1.43 Other 0.71)
Sep 2015	44.04	47.50	12.50	14.17	5.00	20.83 (Note: ANEL 5.83 XA 5.00 Potami 3.33 EK 1.67 Other 5.00)
Jan 2015	42.91	46.72	23.77	12.30	3.28	13.93 (Note: XA 3.28 DIMAR 3.28 Potami 2.46 ANEL 2.46 KIDISO 2.46)
Jun 2012	45.24	46.88	15.63	11.72	6.25	19.52 (Note: ANEL 8.59 XA 4.69 DIMAR 1.56 Other 4.68)
May 2012	49.66	26.43	5.71	2.86	7.14	57.86 (Note: KOISY 30.71 ANEL 18.57 XA 3.57 OP 2.86 Other 2.15)
2009	66.19	46.67	40.56	3.33	1.67	7.77 (Note: LAOS 5.00 OP 1.11 XA 1.11 Other 0.55)
2007	54.01	54.11	34.25	0.68	8.90	2.06 (Note: KKE M–L 1.37 Other 0.69)
2004	75.00	62.11	33.16	1.58	2.63	0.52
2000	66.50	59.54	31.30	3.05 (Note: as Syn)	1.53	4.58 (Note: DIKKI 3.82 Other 0.76)
1996	71.05	46.27	38.81	2.24	5.22	7.46 (Note: POLAN 2.99 DIKKI 2.24 Other 2.23)
1993	76.06	57.34	35.66	2.10	4.20	0.70
1990	75.14	60.90	30.08	7.52		1.50
Nov 1989	79.44	57.75	34.50	7.75		0.00
Jun 1989	76.92	53.54	38.58	7.09		0.79
1985	67.82	58.47	34.75	1.69 (Note: as KKE-Es)	3.39	1.70
1981	66.45	69.31	25.74	0.00	0.00	4.95 (Note: EDIK 4.95)
1977	79.23	79.61	5.83	0.00 (Note: as Symmachia)	0.00	14.56 (Note: EDIK 13.59 Other 0.97)
1974	78.83	74.07	0.00	0.00		25.93 (Note: DEK 16.67 EK–ND 9.26)

== Sources ==
- Bertarelli, L.V. (1929). Guida d'Italia, Vol. XVII (in Italian). Milano: Consociazione Turistica Italiana.

=== Attribution ===
This article incorporates text from a publication now in the public domain: Smith, William, ed. (1854–1857). "Tragia". Dictionary of Greek and Roman Geography. London: John Murray.
