= Arkoi =

Island in Greece

Native name: Αρκοί
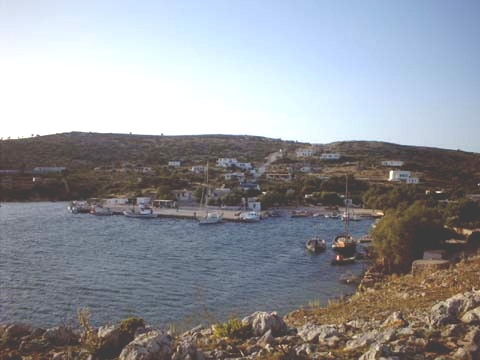
- The main town of Arkoi and its port

- Location within Greece

Geography
- Coordinates: 37.38°N 26.74°E
- Archipelago: Dodecanese
- Total islands: 9
- Area: 6.697 km^{2} (2.586 sq mi)

Administration
- Greece
- Region: South Aegean
- Regional unit: Kalymnos
- Capital city: Arkoi (town)

Demographics
- Population: 44 (2011)

Additional information
- Postal code: 855 00
- Area code: 22470
- Vehicle registration: ΚΧ, ΡΟ, ΡΚ

Arkoi (Greek: Αρκοί; also Arkioi (Αρκιοί)) is a small Greek island in the Dodecanese archipelago, located east of Patmos, north of Leipsoi and southwest of Agathonisi. The island belongs to the municipality of Patmos, which is part of the South Aegean region, and had a population of 54 inhabitants at the 2001 census.

The small population means that there is no real capital, but most inhabitants live close to the main harbour with the rest living scattered around the island on higher ground. The majority of the population finds employment in fishing, merchant shipping, goat herding or running one of the island's four tavernas.

== Geography ==
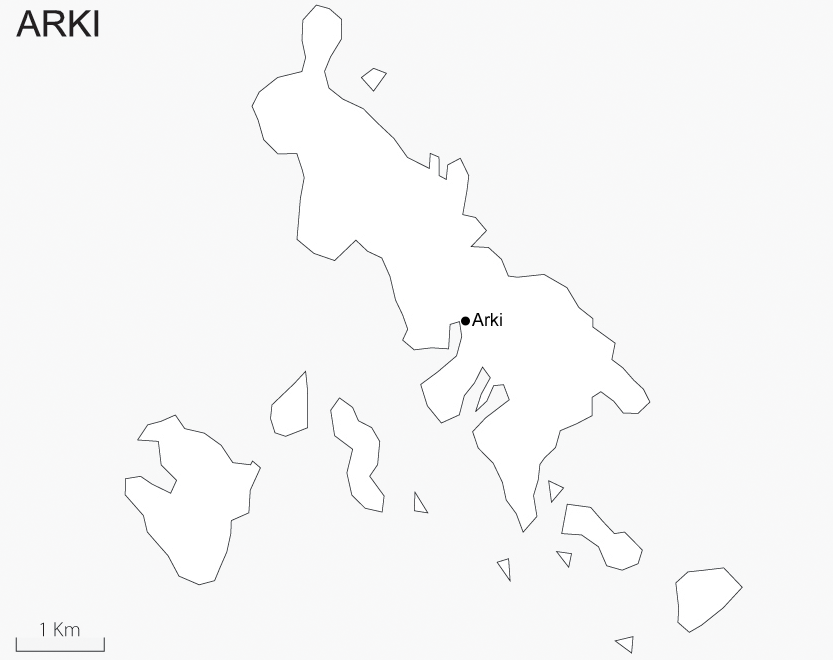

The island is characterized by dry, rocky land with little in the way of vegetation apart from olive trees and some hardy shrubs. Fauna on the island mainly consists of livestock such as goats or donkeys, though herons can be spotted occasionally. The marine life in the bays around the island has not suffered as much as on other Greek islands with various species of grouper and nudibranch present.

== Landmarks ==
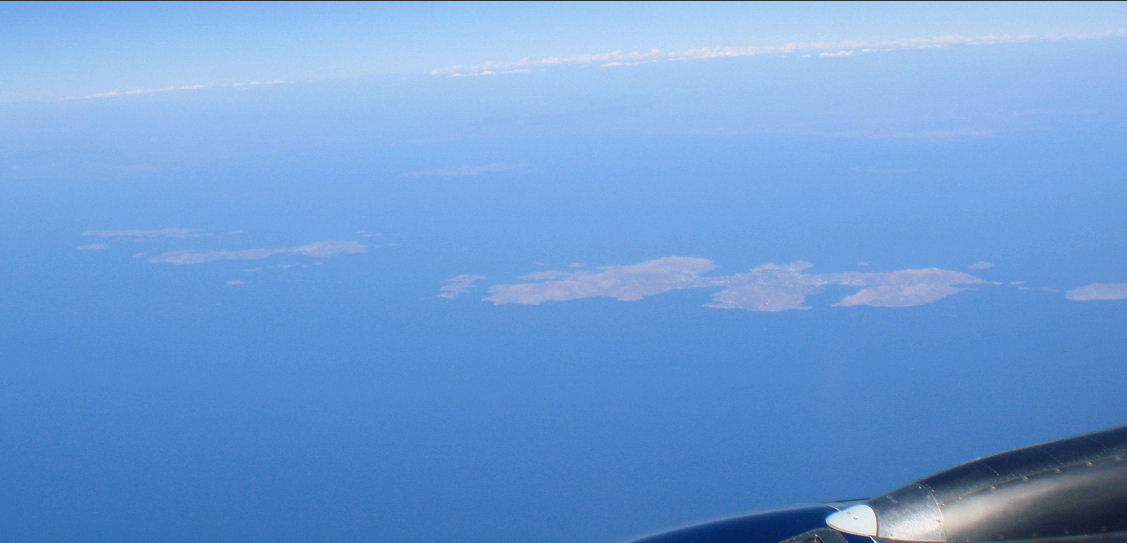
Front, left to right: Arkoi, Leipsoi, Leros. Back, left to right: Agathonisi, Farmakonisi and the Turkey coastline.

On the hill overlooking the main harbour are situated the ruins of an acropolis. Although little remains of the structure, the stones used to build it make a good viewpoint at which to see the sun set over the Aegean. At one end of the island, towards the island of Lipsi is the best beach on the island, Tiganakia. This beach is small and somewhat rocky but provides crystal clear waters to swim in and the view across the bay to the nearby islets is idyllic. This beach can become swamped in high summer (July and August) as day trippers from nearby Lipsi visit the beach frequently. At the other end of the island, in the direction of Samos, is what is referred to as the 'Italian jail'. Villagers say it was used during World War II as a prison by the Italian army, since from 1912 to 1943 the island was part of the Italian Dodecanese. Also at this end of the island is a cave, which contains a number of stalactite and stalagmite formations. The cave is however difficult to find as the land around it is covered by olive trees and bushes.

== Nearby islands ==
The closest inhabited island is that of Marathi, though the closest populations of any significant size are found on the islands of Lipsi and Patmos.

== Transportation ==
There is ferry service that runs between Samos, Patmos, and Lipsi, that calls at the island, as well as occasional small ferries to other nearby islands such as Marathi.
