= Vignoli =

Vignoli is an Italian surname. Notable people with the surname include:

- Alicia Vignoli (1911–2005), Argentine film actress
- Adriano Vignoli (1907–1996), Italian cyclist
- Ana María Vignoli (born 1945), Uruguayan former minister of Social Development
- Farpi Vignoli (1907–1997), Italian sculptor
- Fernando Vignoli (1960–2016), Brazilian painter and sculptor
- Roberto Vignoli (born 1958), Italian photographer
- Sofía Álvarez Vignoli (1899–1986), Uruguayan jurist and briefly First Lady of Uruguay
