= Black Island, Missouri =

Extinct town in the American state of Missouri

Coordinates: 36.256°N 89.705°W

Black Island is an extinct town in Pemiscot County, in the U.S. state of Missouri.

The exact location of the community is unknown to the GNIS. However, coordinates are listed by the GNIS for a church and schoolhouse, now defunct, which once belonged to the community. The town was so named on account of their rich soil and for the fact the elevated town site was prone to becoming an island during high water.
