= Kalymnos (regional unit) =

Kalymnos Περιφερειακή ενότητα Καλύμνου
- Regional unit
- Municipalities of the Dodecanese

- Kalymnos within Greece

- Location within Greece
- Coordinates: 37°0′N 27°0′E
- Country: Greece
- Administrative region: South Aegean
- Seat: Pothia

Area
  - Total: 399.7 km^{2} (154.3 sq mi)

Population (2021)
  - Total: 31,383
  - Density: 78.52/km^{2} (203.4/sq mi)
- Time zone: UTC+2 (EET)
  - Summer (DST): UTC+3 (EEST)

Kalymnos (Greek: Περιφερειακή ενότητα Καλύμνου) is one of the regional units of Greece. It is part of the region of South Aegean. The regional unit covers the islands of Kalymnos, Agathonisi, Astypalaia, Leipsoi, Leros, Patmos and several smaller islands in the Aegean Sea.

== Administration ==
As a part of the 2011 Kallikratis government reform, the regional unit Kalymnos was created out of part of the former Dodecanese Prefecture. It is subdivided into 6 municipalities. These are (number as in the map in the infobox):

- Agathonisi (2)
- Astypalaia (3)
- Kalymnos (4)
- Leipsoi (8)
- Leros (9)
- Patmos (12)

== Province ==
The province of Kalymnos (Greek: Επαρχία Καλύμνου) was one of the provinces of the Dodecanese Prefecture. It had the same territory as the present regional unit. It was abolished in 2006.
