= Leipsoi =

Leipsoi Λειψοί
- Municipality
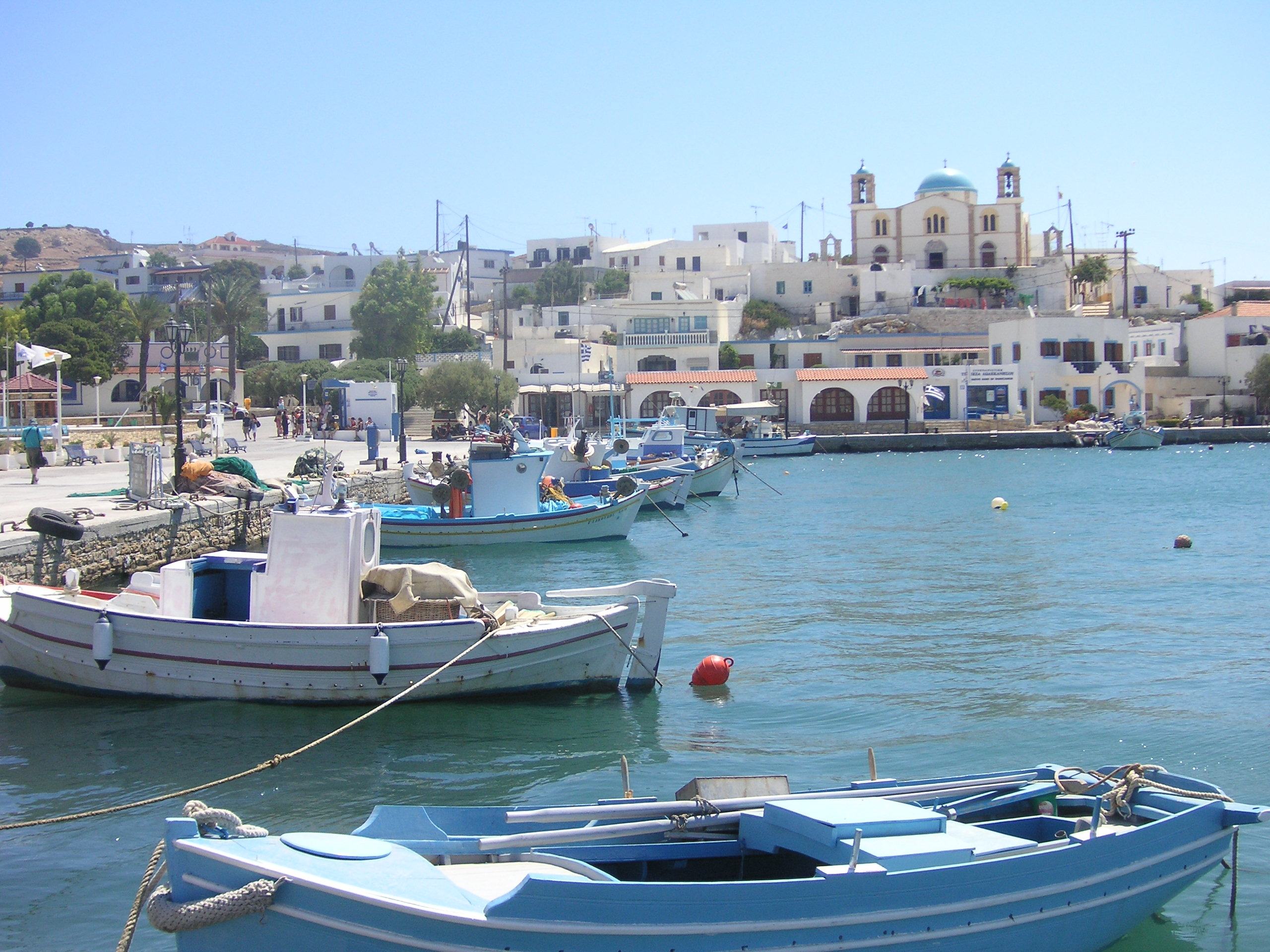
- Leipsoi, viewed from the harbour

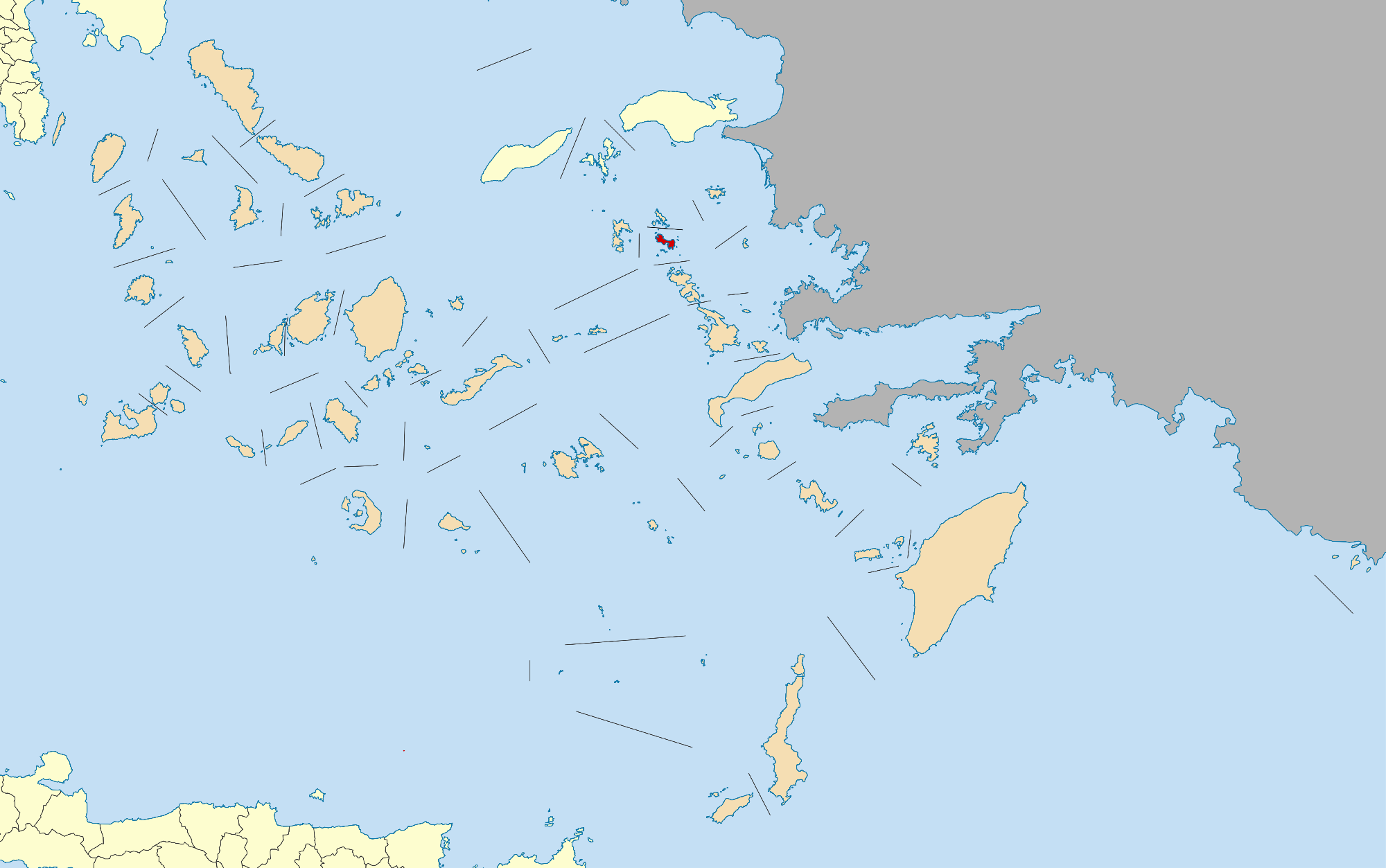

- Location within Greece
- Coordinates: 37°18′N 26°45′E
- Country: Greece
- Administrative region: South Aegean
- Regional unit: Kalymnos

Area
  - Municipality: 17.35 km^{2} (6.70 sq mi)

Population (2021)
  - Municipality: 778
  - Density: 44.8/km^{2} (116/sq mi)
- Time zone: UTC+2 (EET)
  - Summer (DST): UTC+3 (EEST)
- Postal code: 850 01
- Area code: 22470
- Vehicle registration: ΚΧ, ΡΟ, ΡΚ
- Website: https://www.Lipsi-Island.com/

Leipsoi (Greek: Λειψοί [liˈpsi]; also: Lipsi; Ancient Greek: Λέψια, Lepsia) is an island south of Samos and to the north of Leros in Greece. It is well served with ferries passing between Patmos and Leros and on the main route for ferries from Piraeus. Leipsoi is a small group of islets at the northern part of the Dodecanese near Patmos island and Leros. The larger Leipsi-Arkoi archipelago consists of some 37 islands and islets of which only three are larger than 1 square kilometre (247 acres): Leipsoi (15.95 square kilometres (6.16 mi^{2})), Arkoi (6.7 square kilometres (2.59 mi^{2}), part of Patmos municipality) and Agreloussa (1.32 square kilometres (0.51 mi^{2}), part of Patmos municipality). Only Leipsoi, Arkoi, and Marathos are inhabited. Leipsoi is a municipality, part of the Kalymnos regional unit, which is part of the South Aegean region. The municipality has an area of 17.350 square kilometres (6.699 mi^{2}). In ancient times, it contained a town named Lepsia.

== Geography ==
The island contains springs at Fountani, alias Pikri Nero, in the area near Kimissi, along with other minor springs also flowing in this region. The Cave of Ontas dominates the settlement. A 960-metre-long (3,150 ft) paved path carved into the hill connects the upper quarters of Kimissi with the lower ones.
