= Greece–Italy relations =

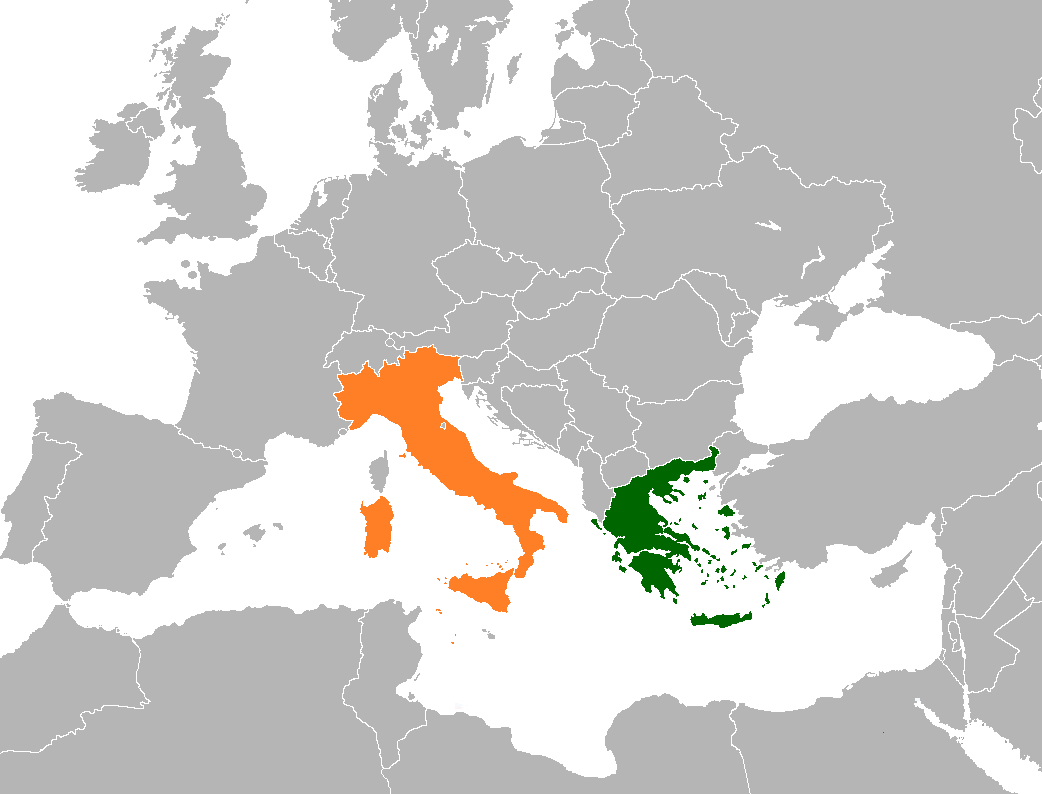
- Greece: Italy

Diplomatic mission
- Embassy of Greece, Rome: Embassy of Italy, Athens

Greece and Italy enjoy special and very strong bilateral diplomatic relations. Modern diplomatic relations between the two countries were established right after Italy's unification. During the second world war, Italy under Mussolini waged war against Greece. Today relations are again regarded as cordial. The two states cooperate in fields of energy, security, culture and tourism, and are major trading partners, both in exports and imports. Greeks and Italians often exchange the phrase "una faccia, una razza", meaning "one face, one race". Greece and Italy share strong cultural ties which date back to Antiquity.

Greece and Italy share common political views about the Balkans, the Mediterranean Basin, and the world, and are leading supporters of the integration of all the Balkan nations to the "Euro-Atlantic family", and promoted the "Agenda 2014", which was proposed by the Greek Government in 2004 as part of the EU-Western Balkans Summit in Thessaloniki, to integrate the Western Balkan nations into the EU by the year 2014, when Greece and Italy assumed the rotating Presidency of the European Union for the first and second halves of 2014, respectively.

The two countries are European Union, NATO and United Nations member states, and cooperate in many other multilateral organizations, such as the Organization for Security and Co-operation in Europe, the Organisation for Economic Co-operation and Development, the World Trade Organization, and the Union for the Mediterranean, while at same time they are promoting closer diplomatic relations and cooperation with other key countries and organizations, such as the United States, Israel and the African Union.

== History ==
=== Antiquity ===
Greek territories and colonies during the Archaic period (750–550 BC)

Relations between the regions of present-day Greece and Italy date back to ancient times. As early as the 8th century BC, Greek settlers founded colonies in the south of the Italian peninsula (later known as Magna Graecia). The Greeks brought urban lifestyles, their religion, winegrowing and their alphabet to southern Italy. Even after the Roman conquest of Greece in the 2nd century BC, the cultural influence of the Greeks on Rome remained very significant. The Romans admired Greek art and philosophy and adopted many elements of Greek culture, for example in architecture and literature. At the same time, Rome and Greek-speaking empires expanded their political interests in their respective territories. In the period that followed, the so-called Greco-Roman culture and civilization developed, combining elements of both ancient worlds. Cities such as Naples and Taranto in Italy remained Greek in character and predominantly Greek-speaking for a long time, even under Roman rule. The Greek influence on ancient Rome was evident in many ways in art, culture, and architecture. Many members of the Roman elite spoke Greek, and Roman authors (such as Cicero) showed great admiration for Greek philosophy.

=== Middle Ages and early modern period ===
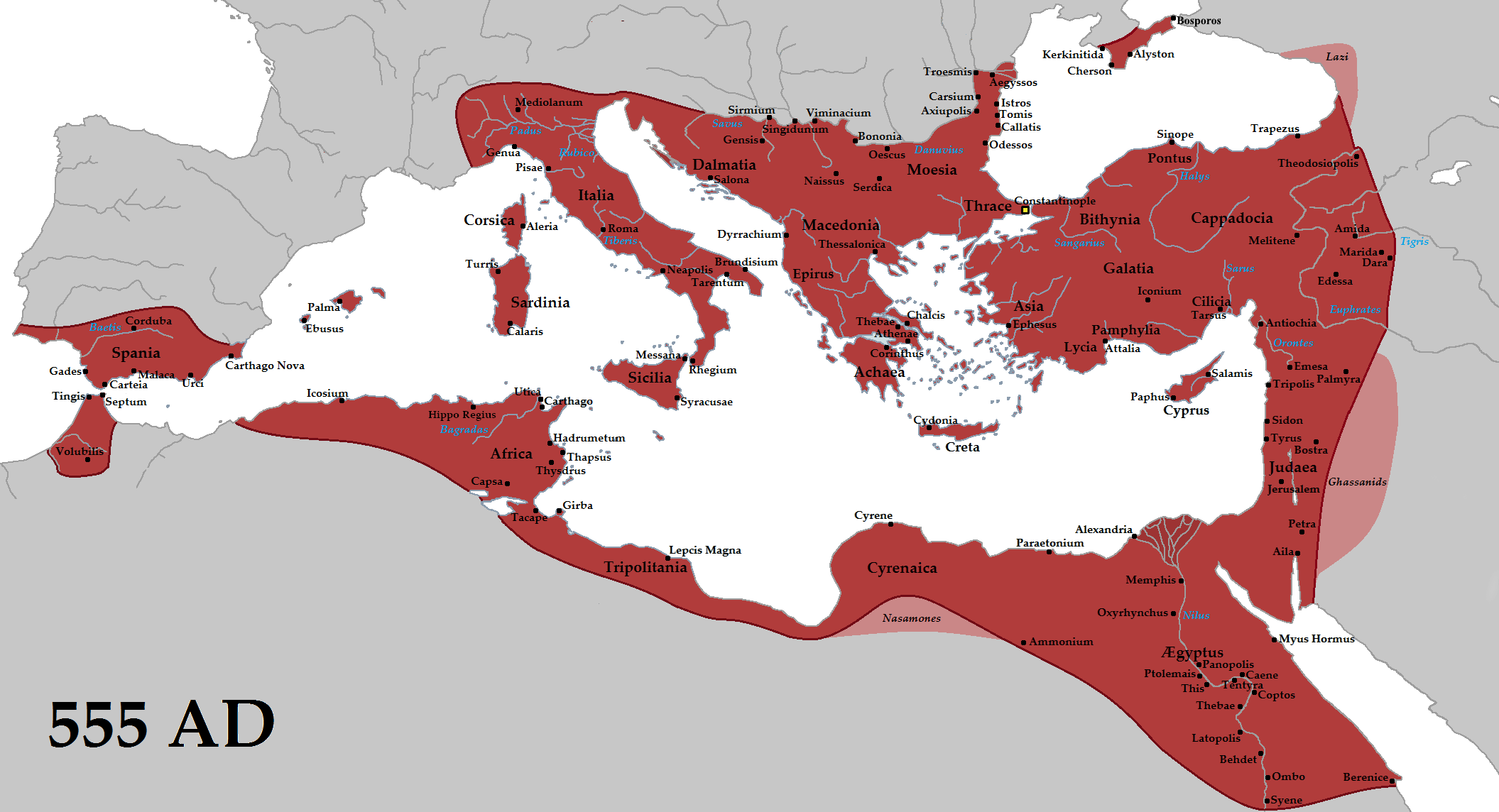
Eastern Roman Empire in 555 AD during the reign of Justinian I.

After the collapse of the Western Roman Empire (5th century), the Greek-speaking eastern part of the empire – the Byzantine Empire – remained intact for almost a millennium. Byzantium also ruled over parts of Italy at various times, including southern Italy in the 6th–8th centuries. In parts of southern Italy (Calabria and Apulia), Greek-speaking communities persisted into the Middle Ages, partly as remnants of antiquity and partly due to Byzantine immigration. These Griko dialects are still spoken today in some villages in Apulia and Calabria. During the Middle Ages, however, the Byzantines and the rising Italian powers were also rivals. From the 13th century onwards, the Republic of Venice gained important strongholds in Greece. Venice ruled over the Ionian Islands for several centuries (from the 14th to the late 18th century). At times, Venetian or Genovese nobles also controlled mainland areas in Greece (such as the Latin Empire after the Fourth Crusade in 1204). Venice played an important role as a colonial power, particularly in Crete (1211–1669) and Cyprus (1474–1571). The Venetian presence left lasting traces in Greece, for example in the form of fortifications and cultural influences on the Ionian Islands. At the same time, close contacts existed between Italian and Greek port cities through Mediterranean trade.

However, from the 15th century onwards, the Ottoman Empire replaced Byzantium as the dominant power in Greece, increasingly pushing back Italian spheres of influence. Nevertheless, cultural exchange remained lively: after the Ottoman conquest of Constantinople in 1453, many Byzantine Greek scholars fled to Italy, bringing with them valuable ancient manuscripts and their knowledge. These scholars (such as Bessarion and John Argyropoulos) made a significant contribution to the Renaissance in Italy by promoting the study of Greek antiquity and transmitting ancient knowledge to the West. Cultural exchange intensified during this period: Italian humanists learned Greek, translated ancient Greek works into Latin, and the first printed editions of Greek classics appeared in Italy. In this way, Greek intellectuals in exile laid important foundations for science and culture in the Italian Renaissance (see Greek scholars in the Renaissance).

=== 19th century ===
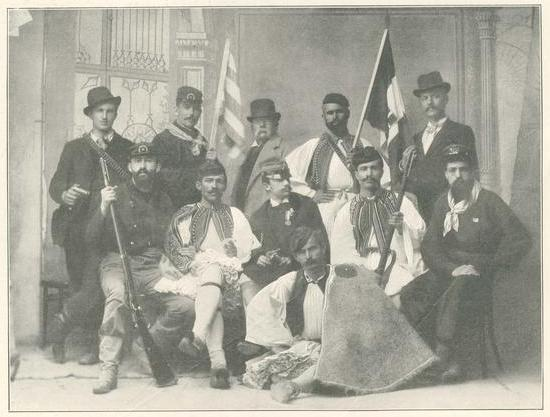
Greeks with Italian volunteers in the Greco-Turkish War in 1897.

Greece (which had gained its independence in 1830) and Italy established diplomatic relations in 1861, immediately upon Italy's unification. Italian philhellenes had contributed to the Greek independence, such as the jurist Vincenzo Gallina, Annibale Santorre di Rossi de Pomarolo, Count of Santarosa, and Giuseppe Rosaroll.

Throughout the 19th century, Italian philhellenes continued to support Greece politically and militarily. For example, Ricciotti Garibaldi led a volunteer expedition (Garibaldini) in the Greco-Turkish War of 1897. A group of Garibaldini, headed by the Greek poet Lorentzos Mavilis, fought also with the Greek side during the Balkan Wars.

=== 20th century ===
In early 1912, during the Italo-Turkish War, Italy occupied the predominantly Greek-inhabited Dodecanese Islands in the Aegean Sea from the Ottoman Empire. Although later with the 1919 Venizelos–Tittoni agreement, Italy promised to cede them to Greece, Carlo Sforza in 1920 renounced the accord.

In 1913, after the end of the First Balkan War, lands of Northern Epirus were ceded to Greece, but Italy challenged the decision and in the Treaty of London the region was given to the newly created Albania. The local Greek population was enraged and created the Autonomous Republic of Northern Epirus, before it was reluctantly ceded to Albania, with peace assured by Italian peacekeeping force until 1919. Italy rejected the decision because it didn't want Greece to control both sides of the Straits of Corfu. In addition, although Sazan Island was ceded to Greece in 1864 as part of the Diapontia Islands, Greece ceded the island to the newly independent Albania in 1914 after the pressure of Italy, and since Greece didn't want to risk a war with Italy. Italy took possession of the island in 1920 and kept it through World War II.

During the World War I, both Italy and Greece were members of the Allies and fought against the Central Powers but when the Italians found that Greece had been promised land in Anatolia at the Paris Peace Conference, 1919, the Italian delegation withdrew from the conference for several months. Italy occupied parts of Anatolia which threatened the Greek occupation zone and the city of Smyrna. Greek troops were landed and the Greco-Turkish War (1919–22) began with Greek troops advanced into Anatolia. Turkish forces eventually defeated the Greeks and with Italian aid, recovered the lost territory, including Smyrna.

When the Italian fascists gained power in 1922, they persecuted the Greek-speakers in Italy. In addition, the Greeks in Dodecanese and Northern Epirus, which back then were under Italian occupation and influence respectively, were persecuted.

In 1923, the new Italian Prime Minister Benito Mussolini used the murder of an Italian general on the Greco-Albanian border as a pretext to bombard and temporarily occupy Corfu, due to Corfu's strategic position at the entrance of the Adriatic Sea.

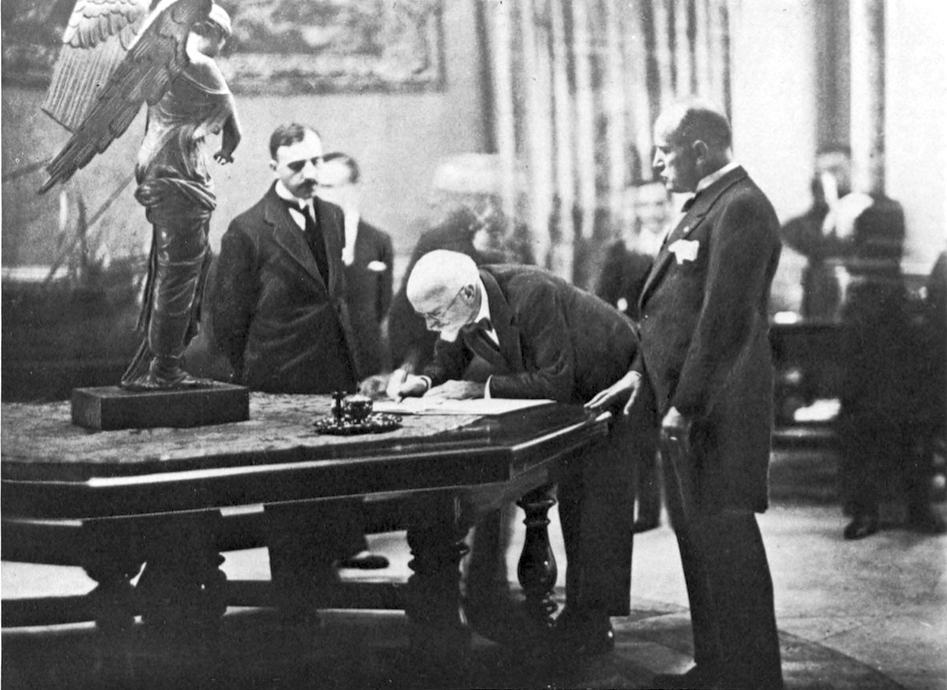
Eleftherios Venizelos signs the Treaty of Friendship with Italy in Rome on 23 September 1928, while Benito Mussolini looks on

The Greek general Theodoros Pangalos, who governed Greece as a dictator in 1925–26, sought to revise the Treaty of Lausanne of 1923 and launch a revanchist war against Turkey. To this end, Pangalos sought Italian diplomatic support, as Italy still had ambitions in Anatolia, but in the event, nothing came of his overtures to Mussolini. After the fall of Pangalos and the restoration of relative political stability in 1926, efforts were undertaken to normalize relations with Greece's neighbours. To this end, the Greek government, especially Foreign Minister Andreas Michalakopoulos, put renewed emphasis on improving relations with Italy, leading to the signature of a trade agreement in November 1926. The Italian–Greek rapprochement had a positive impact on Greek relations with other Balkan countries, and after 1928 was continued by the new government of Eleftherios Venizelos, culminating in the treaty of friendship signed by Venizelos in Rome on 23 September 1928. Mussolini favoured this treaty, as it aided in his efforts to diplomatically isolate Yugoslavia from potential Balkan allies. An offer of alliance between the two countries was rebuffed by Venizelos but during the talks Mussolini personally offered "to guarantee Greek sovereignty" on Macedonia and assured Venizelos that in case of an external attack on Thessaloniki by Yugoslavia, Italy would join Greece.

During the late 1920s and early 1930s, Mussolini sought diplomatically to create "an Italian-dominated Balkan bloc that would link Turkey, Greece, Bulgaria, and Hungary". Venizelos countered the policy with diplomatic agreements among Greek neighbours and established an "annual Balkan conference ... to study questions of common interest, particularly of an economic nature, with the ultimate aim of establishing some kind of regional union". This increased diplomatic relations and by 1934 was resistant to "all forms of territorial revisionism". Venizelos adroitly maintained a principle of "open diplomacy" and was careful not to alienate traditional Greek patrons in Britain and France. The Greco-Italian friendship agreement ended Greek diplomatic isolation and the beginning of a series of bilateral agreements, most notably the Greco-Turkish Friendship Convention in 1930. This process culminated in the signature of the Balkan Pact between Greece, Yugoslavia, Turkey and Romania, which was a counter to Bulgarian irredentism.

Italy, an Axis power, invaded Greece in the Greco-Italian War of 1940–41, but it was only with German intervention that the Axis succeeded in controlling Greece. Italian forces were part of the Axis occupation of Greece. Italy ceded the Dodecanese to Greece as part of the Treaty of Peace following World War II in 1947. As a consequence most of the Italians emigrated. After World War II and at the end of the Italian fascist regime, relations between the two countries were significantly improved. Many Greeks, mostly leftists, found also refuge in Italy during the Greek military junta years. Today, there are still historical Greek communities in Italy and Italian communities in Greece.

=== 21st century ===
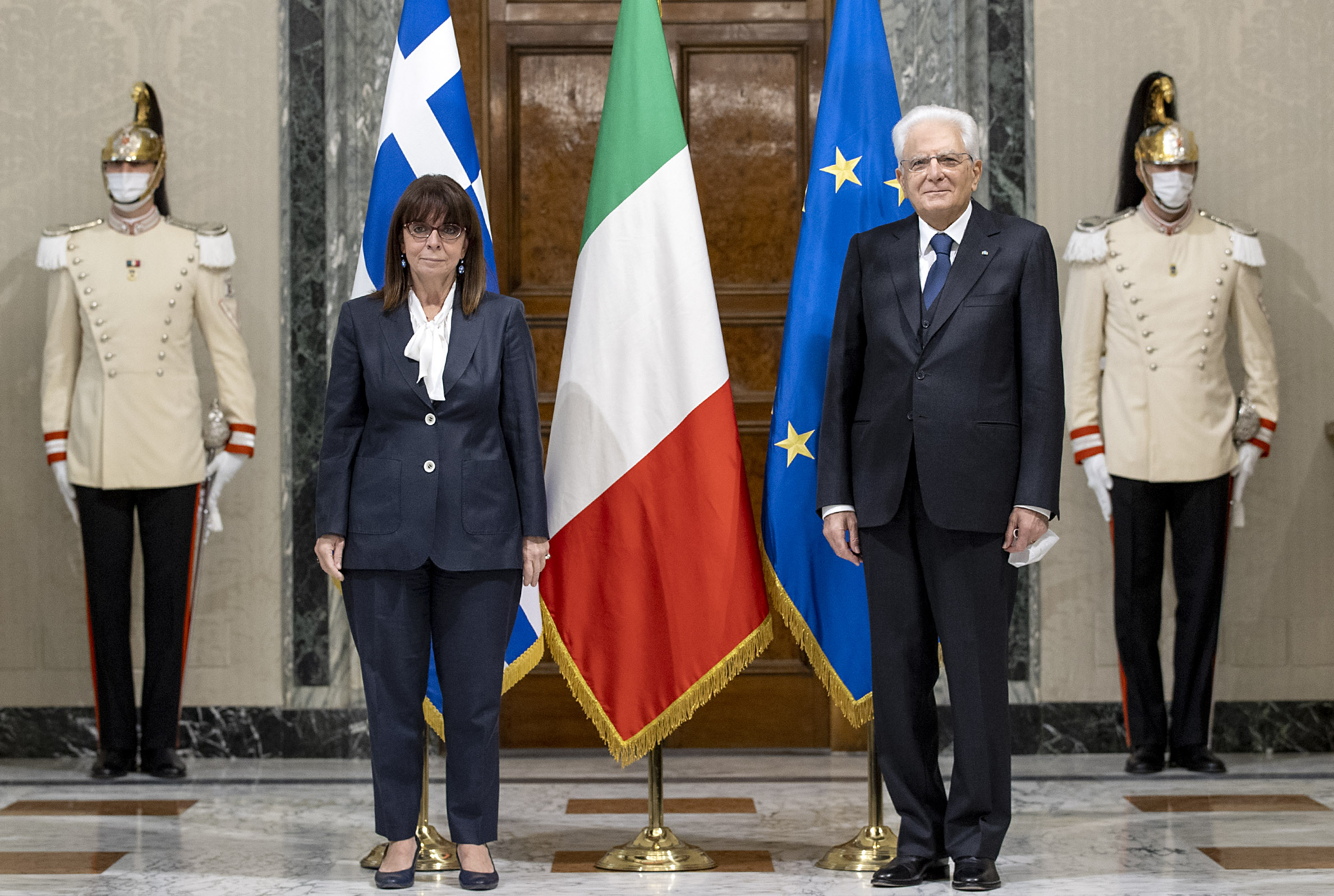
Katerina Sakellaropoulou and Sergio Mattarella in Rome in October 2020

Relations between the two countries have stayed strong in the 21st century. In December 2022, Italian prime minister Giorgia Meloni referred to the "close relationship" between Greece and Italy, mentioning the common issues, interests and approaches both countries share. She encouraged that Greece and Italy's cooperation and work together "must continue". Meloni also said that she is "extremely interested in working to further enhance bilateral relations with Greece" to solve migration crises. Meloni and Greek prime minister Kyriakos Mitsotakis met each other in Brussels on 15 December 2022. Meloni called the meeting "cordial and fruitful", while both gave a "shared will" to strengthen relations even further. In September 2023, Meloni and Mitsotakis met in Athens to discuss cooperation in the fields of energy and migrant issues.

== Bilateral relations and cooperation ==
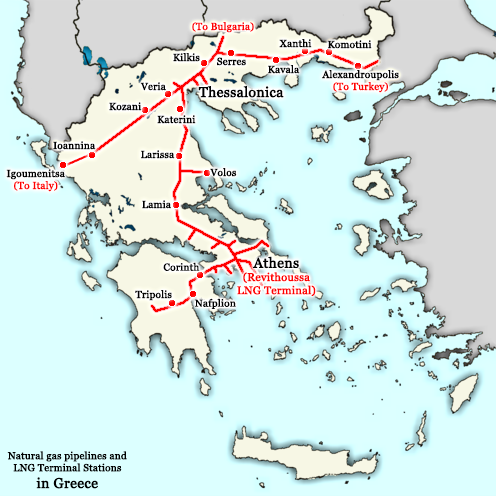
Greece–Italy pipeline. A map showing the approximate locations of natural gas pipelines through Greece to Italy

Greece is one of Italy's main economic partners and they co-operate in many fields, including judicial, scientific and educational, and on the development of tourism, an important sector in both countries. There are regular high-level visits between the two countries, such as the visit of the Greek Prime Minister Antonis Samaras to Italy in July 2014, and there are frequent contacts between the two countries at ministerial level on various matters concerning individual sectors.

Current projects between the two countries include the Greece–Italy pipeline (which is part of the Interconnector Turkey-Greece-Italy pipeline (ITGI)), and the Trans Adriatic Pipeline (TAP).

== Military collaboration ==
Greece and Italy are NATO allies and maintain a close military cooperation. The exercise "Italic Weld", which was a combined air-naval-ground exercise in northern Italy involving the United States, Italy, Turkey, and Greece, appears to have been one of the first exercises in which the new Italian Army orientation was tested.

An Italian military contingent participated in a NATO mission to assist Greece in ensuring security during the 2004 Summer Olympics.

The two countries, along with the United States, also are participating in large-scale military drills conducted on annual basis by non-NATO member Israel, which are code-named "Blue Flag", and which take place in the region of eastern Mediterranean.

On March 27, 2017, Italy participated in "Iniochus 2017" military exercise, which is organized annually by Greece, along with the United States, Israel, and the United Arab Emirates.

== Multilateral organizations ==
Both countries are full members of many international organizations, including NATO, the European Union, the Council of Europe, the OECD and the WTO. Greece and Italy were also part of the European Territorial Cooperation Programme (2007–2013), for the boost of cross-border cooperation in the Mediterranean Sea.

== Cultural interaction ==
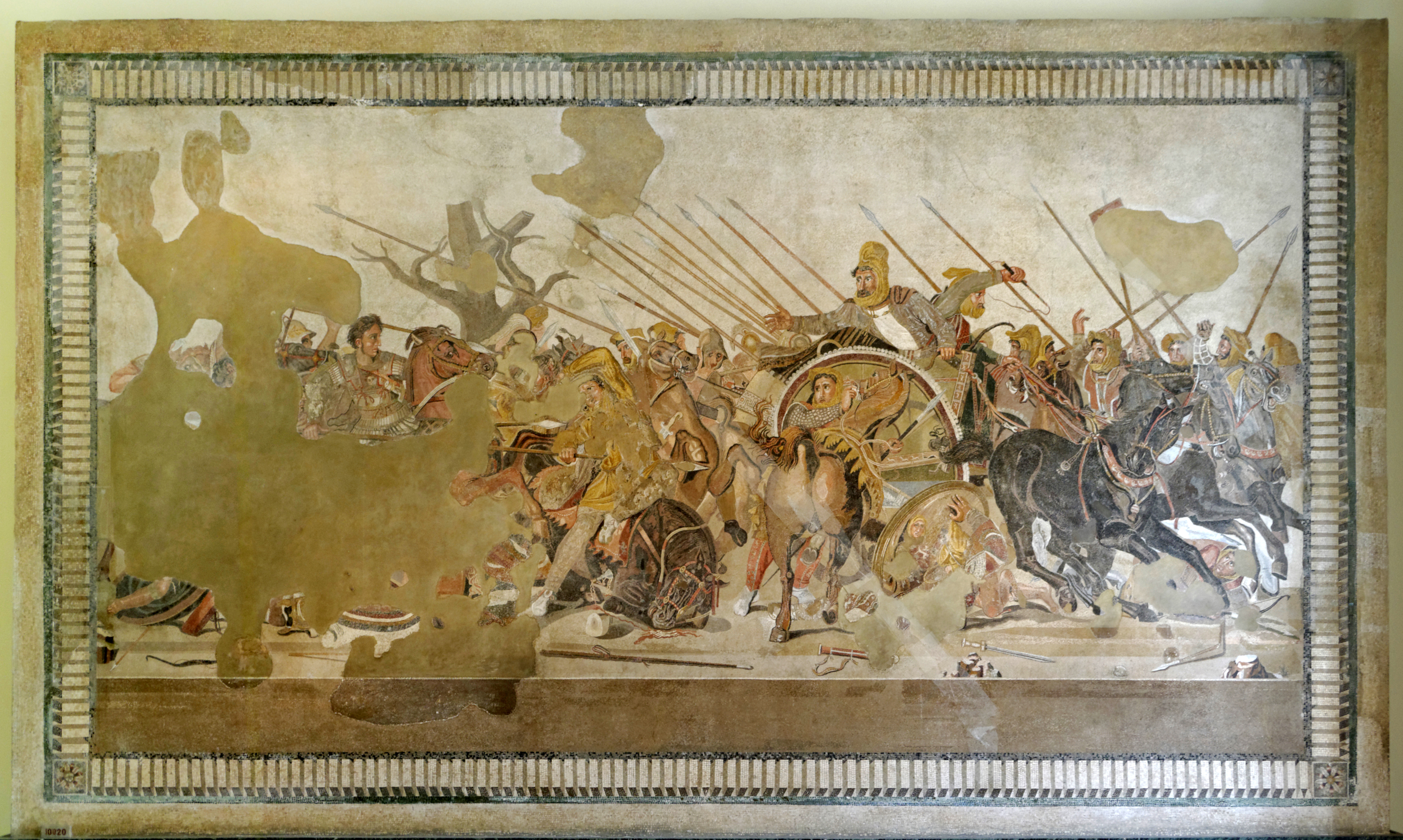
The Alexander Mosaic at the National Archaeological Museum, Naples

The Hellenic Institute for Byzantine and Post-Byzantine Studies opened in Venice in 1951, providing for the study of Byzantine and Post-Byzantine history in Italy.

The Istituto Italiano di Cultura di Atene in Athens is responsible for promoting Italian culture in Greece.

In July 2014, an official artistic exhibition with the title "Italy – Greece: one face, one race" was inaugurated in Rome on the occasion of the passing of the EU Council Presidency from Greece to Italy. The title of the exhibition refers to a Greek saying, "μια φάτσα μια ράτσα" (mia fatsa mia ratsa, cf. Italian una faccia, una razza), often used in Greece and Italy to express the perception of close cultural affinities between Greeks and Italians. The term is often believed to have originated in the Italian-occupied Dodecanese Islands in an attempt to unite the people living there, however modern-day Greeks and Italians have since adopted the term for themselves.

== Ethnic minorities ==
Greeks have lived in southern Italy (Magna Grecia) for millennia, and today are called Griko. There are also Italians in Corfu.

== Agreements ==
- Economic Cooperation (1949)
- Avoidance of double Taxation (1964)
- Delimitation of Continental Shelf Boundaries (1977)
- Protection of the Ionian Sea Marine Environment (1979)
- Cooperation against Terrorism, Organised Crime, and Drug Trafficking (1986)

== High level visits ==
- January 2006; state visit of the Greek President Karolos Papoulias to Rome.
- December 2006; Visit of the Italian Prime Minister Romano Prodi to Athens.
- March 2007; official visit of the Greek Foreign Minister Dora Bakoyannis to Rome.
- August 2007; meeting of the Greek Foreign Minister with her Italian counterpart Massimo D'Alema in Rome.
- September 2008; state visit of the Italian President Giorgio Napolitano to Athens.
- August 2012; visit of the Greek Prime Minister Antonis Samaras to Rome.
- September 2012; visit of the Greek President Karolos Papoulias to Italy.
- October 2013; meeting of the Greek Prime Minister Antonis Samaras with his Italian counterpart in Rome.
- July 2014; visit of the Greek Prime Minister Antonis Samaras to Italy.
- February 2015; meeting of the Greek Prime Minister Alexis Tsipras with his Italian counterpart Matteo Renzi in Rome.

== Transportation ==
The Italian ports of Bari, Brindisi, Ancona, Venice and Trieste on the Adriatic Sea's Italian coast have daily passenger and freight ferries to the Greek ports of Corfu, Patra, Igoumenitsa and Kalamata, avoiding overland transit via the Balkan Peninsula.

== Resident diplomatic missions ==
- Greece has an embassy in Rome and consulates-general in Milan and a consulate in Venice.
- Italy has an embassy in Athens.
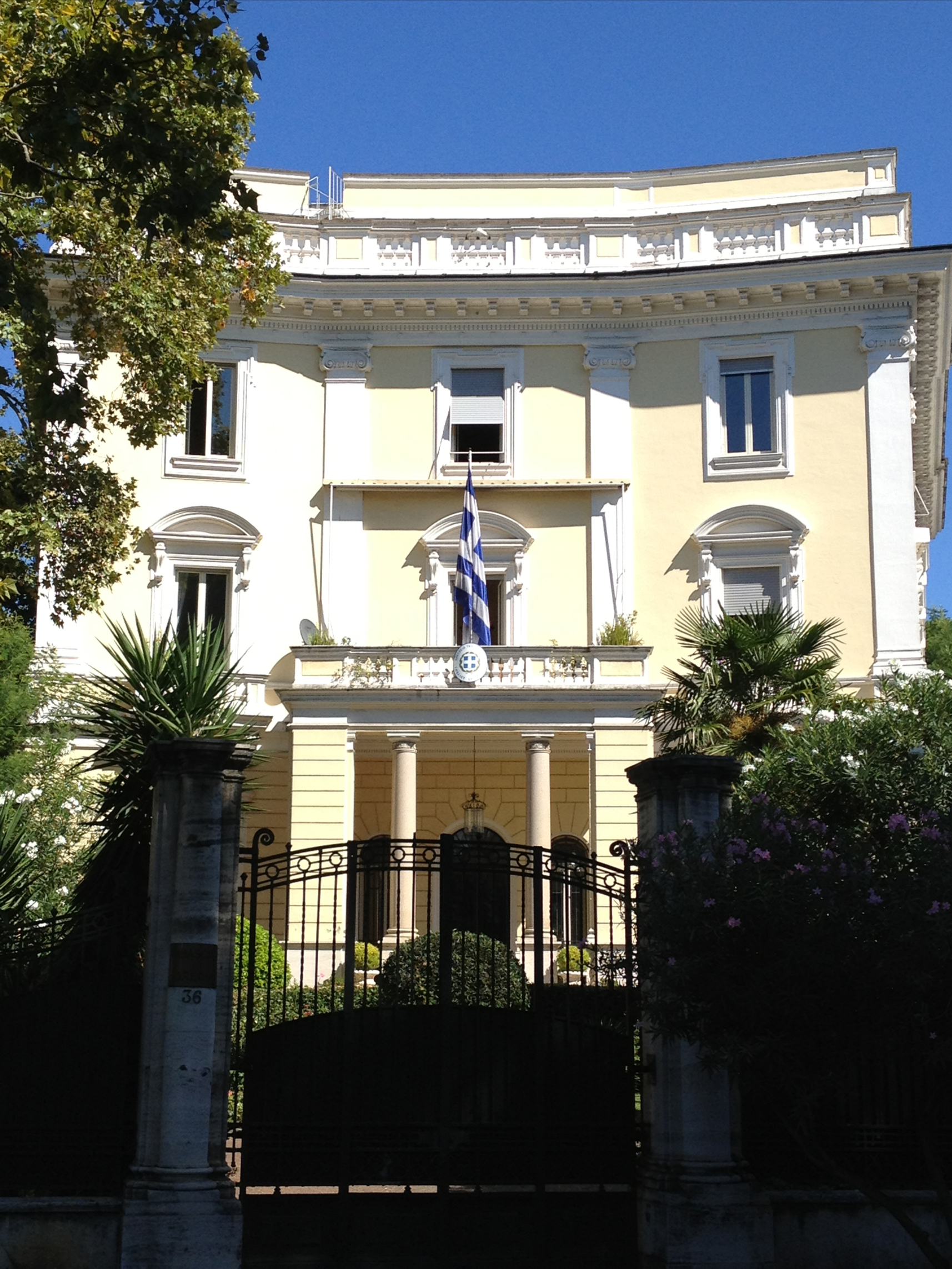
Embassy of Greece in Rome

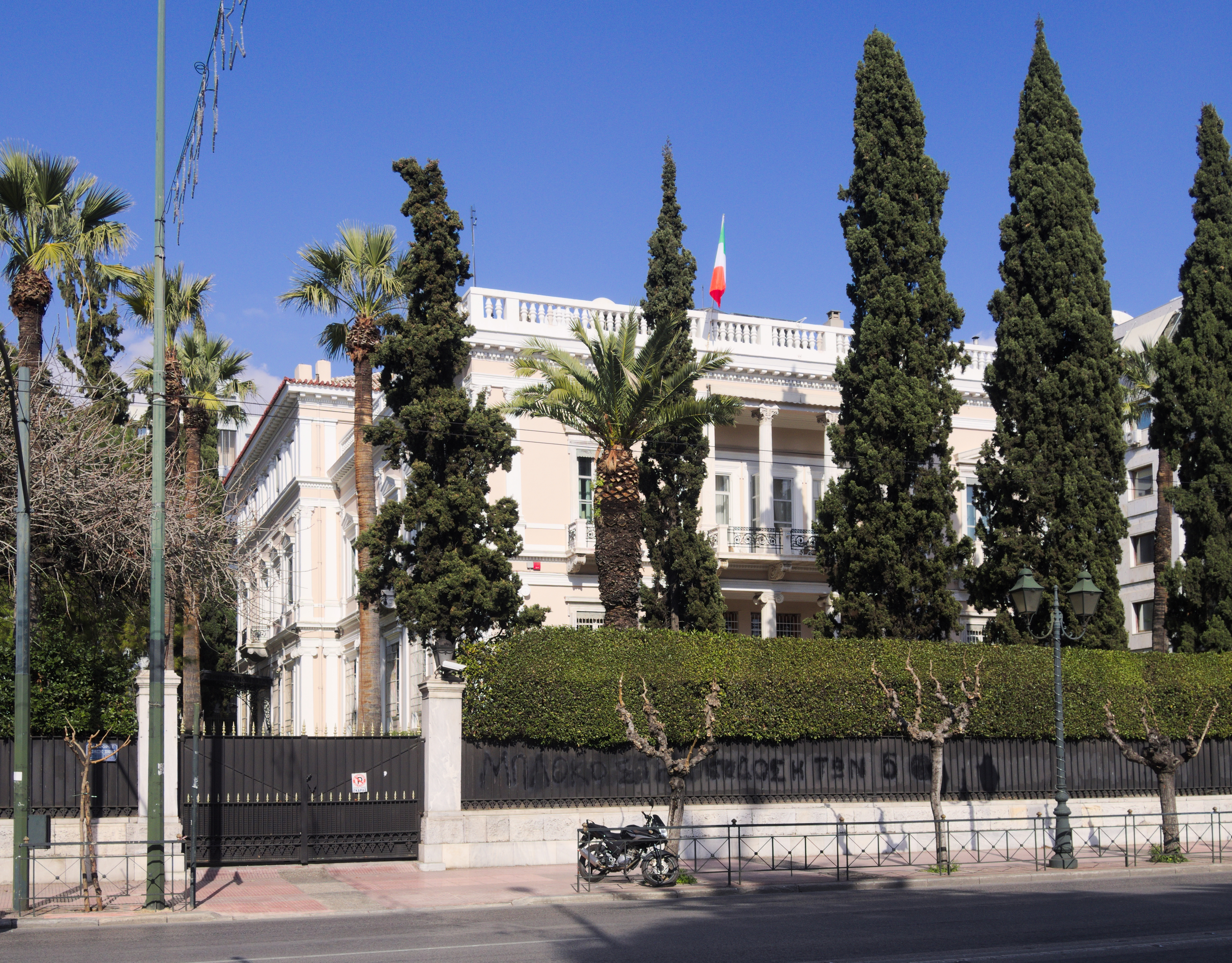
Embassy of Italy in Athens

== See also ==
- Foreign relations of Greece
- Foreign relations of Italy
- Greek scholars in the Renaissance
- Greeks in Italy
- Italians in Greece (disambiguation)
- HVDC Italy–Greece
- Italian School of Archaeology at Athens
- History of Europe
- Roman Greece
- Greco-Roman world

== Sources ==
- Bell, P. M. H. (1997) [1986]. The Origins of the Second World War in Europe (2nd ed.). London: Pearson. ISBN 978-0-582-30470-3.
- Kitromilides, Paschalis M. (2008) [2006]. Eleftherios Venizelos: The Trials of Statesmanship. Edinburgh: Edinburgh University Press. ISBN 978-0-7486-3364-7.
- Klapsis, Antonis (2014). "Attempting to Revise the Treaty of Lausanne: Greek Foreign Policy and Italy during the Pangalos Dictatorship, 1925–1926". Diplomacy & Statecraft. 25 (2): 240–259. doi:10.1080/09592296.2014.907062. S2CID 153689615.
- Plowman, Jeffrey (2013). War in the Balkans: The Battle for Greece and Crete 1940–1941. Barnsley: Pen & Sword Military. ISBN 978-1-78159-248-9.
- Steiner, Zara S. (2005). The Lights that Failed: European International History, 1919–1933. New York: Oxford University Press. ISBN 0-19-822114-2.
- Svolopoulos, Konstantinos (1978). "Η εξωτερική πολιτική της Ελλάδος". Ιστορία του Ελληνικού Έθνους, Τόμος ΙΕ': Νεώτερος ελληνισμός από το 1913 ως το 1941 (in Greek). Ekdotiki Athinon. pp. 342–358.
- Verzijl, J. H. W. (1970). International Law in Historical Perspective (Brill Archive ed.). Leyden: A. W. Sijthoff. ISBN 90-218-9050-X.
