= List of governors of the Italian Islands of the Aegean =

Governor of the Italian Islands of the Aegean
- Governatore della Isole italiane dell'Egeo
- Coat of arms of the Italian Islands of the Aegean

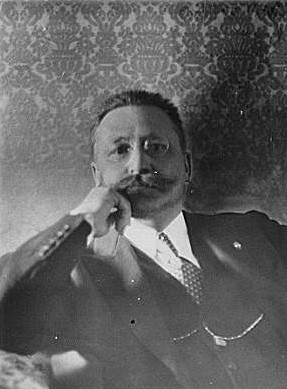
- Longest serving Mario Lago; 16 November 1922 – 27 November 1936
- Reports to: King of Italy
- Residence: Governor's Palace, Rhodes
- Formation: 5 May 1912
- First holder: Giovanni Ameglio
- Final holder: Otto Wagener
- Abolished: 8 May 1945
- Succession: British military administrators in the Aegean

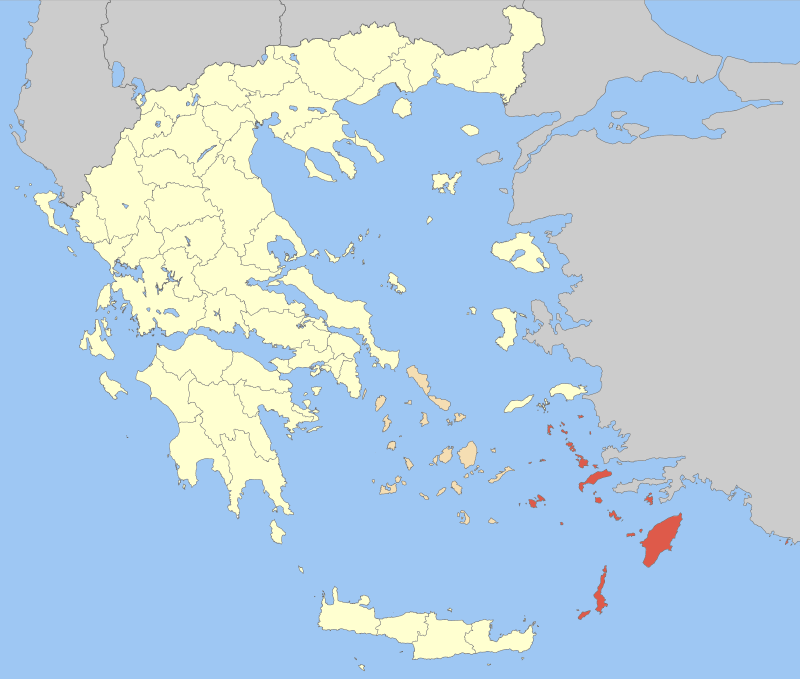
Dodecanese (red) within Greece.

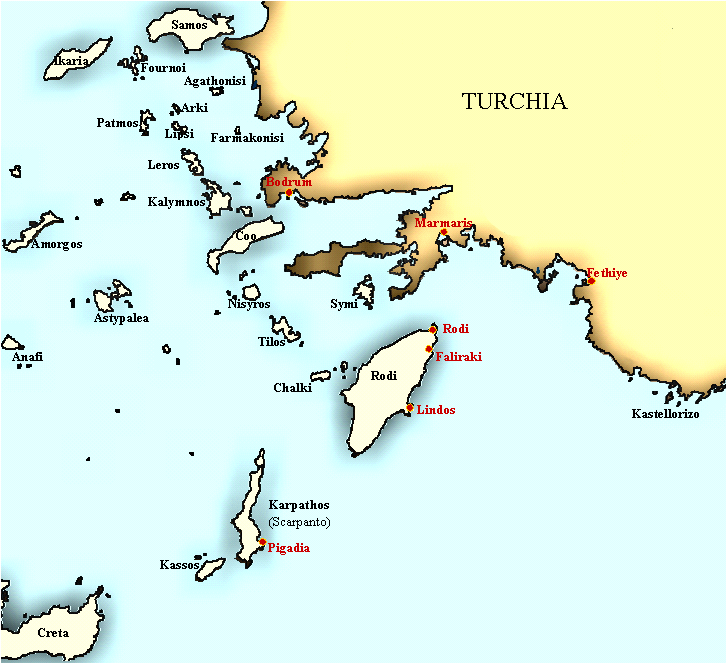
An Italian map of the Dodecanese.

This article lists the governors of the Italian Islands of the Aegean, from 1912 to 1945. It includes Italian commanders and governors, as well as German commanders of the Dodecanese during World War II.

Italy conquered the Dodecanese from the Ottoman Empire in 1912, during the Italo-Turkish War and ceded the islands to Greece in 1947, according to the Treaty of Paris.

== List ==
=== Commanders ===
No.	Portrait	Commander	Took office	Left office	Time in office
1	Giovanni Ameglio	General; Giovanni Ameglio (1854–1921)	5 May 1912	14 October 1913	1 year, 162 days
–	Ferruccio Trombi	General; Ferruccio Trombi (1858–1915); Acting	14 October 1913	9 November 1913	26 days
2	Francesco Marchi	General; Francesco Marchi (?–?)	9 November 1913	26 April 1914	168 days
3	Giovanni Croce	General; Giovanni Croce (?–?)	26 April 1914	26 March 1917	2 years, 334 days
4	Vittorio Elia	General; Vittorio Elia (?–?)	26 March 1917	15 December 1919	2 years, 264 days
5	Achille Porta	General; Achille Porta (1868–1953)	15 December 1919	7 August 1920	236 days
–	Carlo Senni	Carlo Senni (1879–1946); Acting	7 August 1920	16 September 1920	40 days
6	Felice Maiassa	Felice Maiassa (?–?)	16 September 1920	16 August 1921	334 days
7	Alessandro De Bosdari	Alessandro De Bosdari (1867–1929)	16 August 1921	15 November 1922	1 year, 91 days

=== Governors ===
No.	Portrait	Governor	Took office	Left office	Time in office
1	Mario Lago	Mario Lago (1878–1950)	16 November 1922	27 November 1936	14 years, 11 days
2	Cesare Maria De Vecchi	General; Cesare Maria De Vecchi (1884–1959)	2 December 1936	9 December 1940	4 years, 7 days
3	Ettore Bastico	Marshal; Ettore Bastico (1876–1972)	10 December 1940	14 July 1941	216 days
4	Inigo Campioni	Admiral; Inigo Campioni (1878–1944)	14 July 1941	8 September 1943	2 years, 56 days

=== German commanders ===
No.	Portrait	Commander	Took office	Left office	Time in office
1	Ulrich Kleemann	General; Ulrich Kleemann (1892–1963)	8 September 1943	20 July 1944	316 days
2	Otto Wagener	General; Otto Wagener (1888–1971)	20 July 1944	8 May 1945	292 days

== See also ==
- Italian Islands of the Aegean
- Dodecanese
  - Rhodes
- Italian colonists in the Dodecanese
- Turks of the Dodecanese
