= Italian Islands of the Aegean =

Islands formerly ruled by Italy

Italian Islands of the Aegean Isole italiane dell'Egeo (Italian) Ἰταλικαὶ Νῆσοι Αἰγαίου Πελάγους (Greek) Italikai Nisoi Aigaiou Pelagous
- 1912–1945
- Flag Coat of arms
- Motto: Per l'onore d'Italia "For the honour of Italy"
- Anthem: Marcia Reale d'Ordinanza ("Royal March of Ordinance") Giovinezza ("Youth")
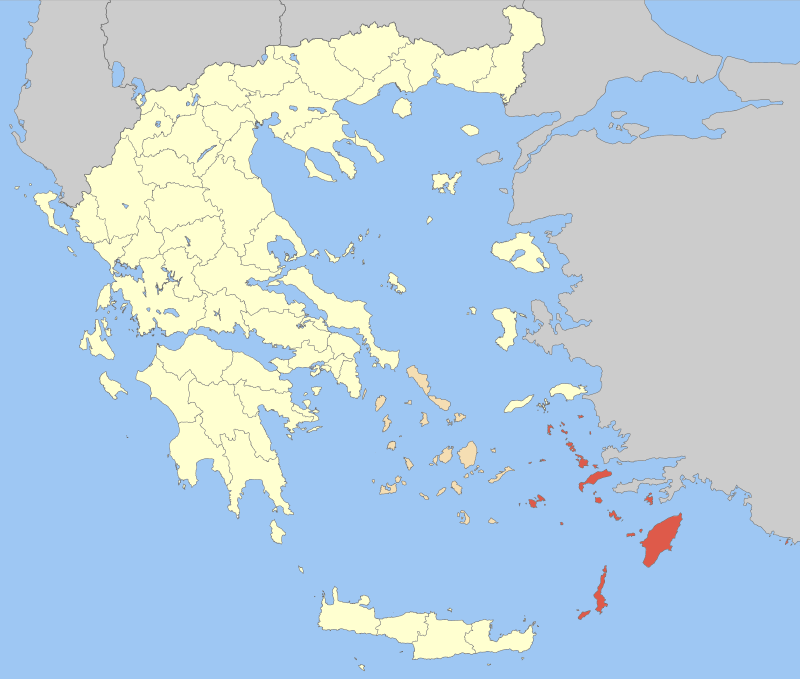
- Status: Colony of Italy
- Capital: Rhodes
- Official languages: Italian
- Common languages: Greek (Aegean Greek), Turkish (Aegean Turkish)
- Religion: Catholic (State) Greek Orthodox, Islam
- King
  - 1912–1945: Victor Emmanuel III
- Governor
  - 1912–1913 (first): Giovanni Ameglio
  - 1943–1945 (last): Iginio Ugo Faralli
- Historical era: Interwar / WWII
  - Italian occupation: 27 April 1912
  - Italian annexation: 24 July 1923
  - Dodecanese campaign: 8 September 1943
  - German occupation: 11 September 1943
  - German surrender: 8 May 1945
  - Ceded to Greece: 10 February 1947
- Currency: Italian lira
Preceded by	Succeeded by
Sanjak of Rhodes; Sanjak of Sakız	Dodecanese Prefecture
- Today part of: Greece

The Italian Islands of the Aegean (Italian: Isole italiane dell'Egeo; Greek: Ἰταλικαὶ Νῆσοι Αἰγαίου Πελάγους) were an archipelago of fourteen islands (the Dodecanese, except Kastellorizo) in the southeastern Aegean Sea, that—together with the surrounding islets—were ruled by the Kingdom of Italy from 1912 to 1943 and the Italian Social Republic (under German occupation) from 1943 to 1945. When the Kingdom of Italy was restored, they remained under its formal possession, and after 1946 under that of the Italian Republic, until they were ceded to the Kingdom of Greece in 1947 under the Treaty of Paris; in practice, they were under British occupation during this period.

== Background ==
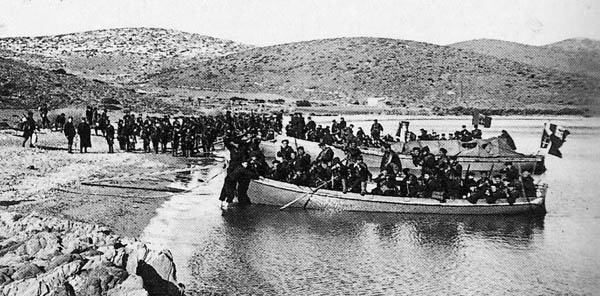
Italian landing at Rhodes on May 4, 1912, during the Italo-Turkish War

The Dodecanese, except Kastellorizo, were occupied by Italy during the Italo-Turkish War of 1912. Italy had agreed to return the islands to the Ottoman Empire according to the Treaty of Ouchy in 1912; however the vagueness of the text allowed a provisional Italian administration of the islands, and Turkey eventually renounced all claims on the Dodecanese with Article 15 of the Treaty of Lausanne in 1923.

The provisional Italian regime on the islands, titled "Rhodes and the Dodecanese" (Rodi e Dodecaneso), was originally in the hands of military governors, until the appointment on 7 August 1920 of Count Carlo Senni as the Viceroy of the Dodecanese (Reggente del Dodecaneso). Following the end of World War I, Italy agreed twice, in the Venizelos–Tittoni agreement of 1919 and the Treaty of Sèvres in 1920, to cede the islands to Greece except for Rhodes, which would enjoy extensive autonomy. Due to the Greek embroilment and defeat in the Greco-Turkish War of 1919–22, these agreements were never implemented.

Kastellorizo was temporarily occupied by France in 1915 and came under Italian control in 1921. The Dodecanese islands were formally annexed by Fascist Italy, as the Possedimenti Italiani dell'Egeo in 1923.

Italian interest in the Dodecanese was rooted in strategic purposes, and the islands were intended to further the Empire's long range imperial policy. The islands of Leros and Patmos were used as bases for the Royal Italian Navy.

In 1932 the Convention between Italy and Turkey was signed for some smaller islets around Kastellorizo.

== Administrative policies ==
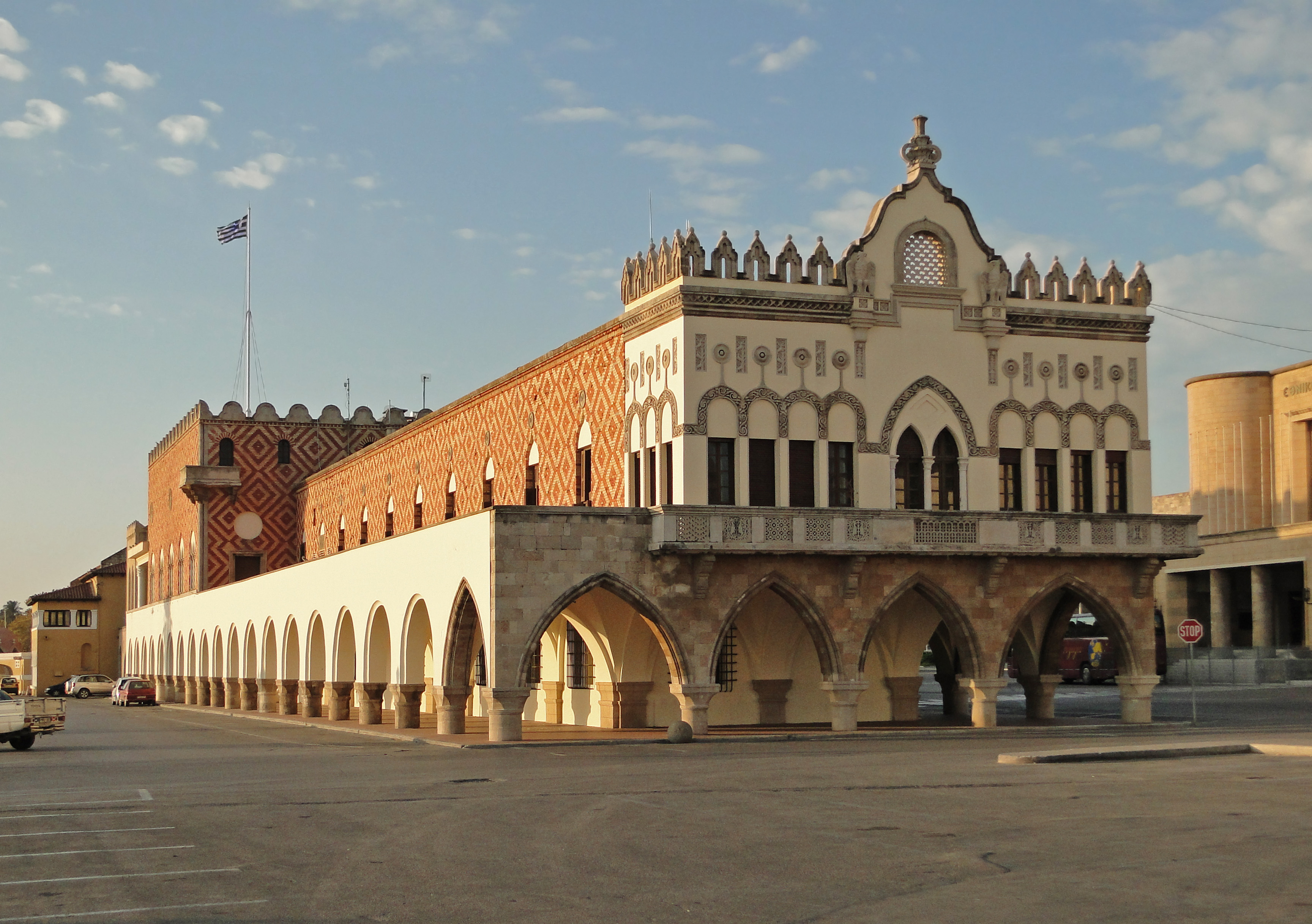
Palazzo Governale

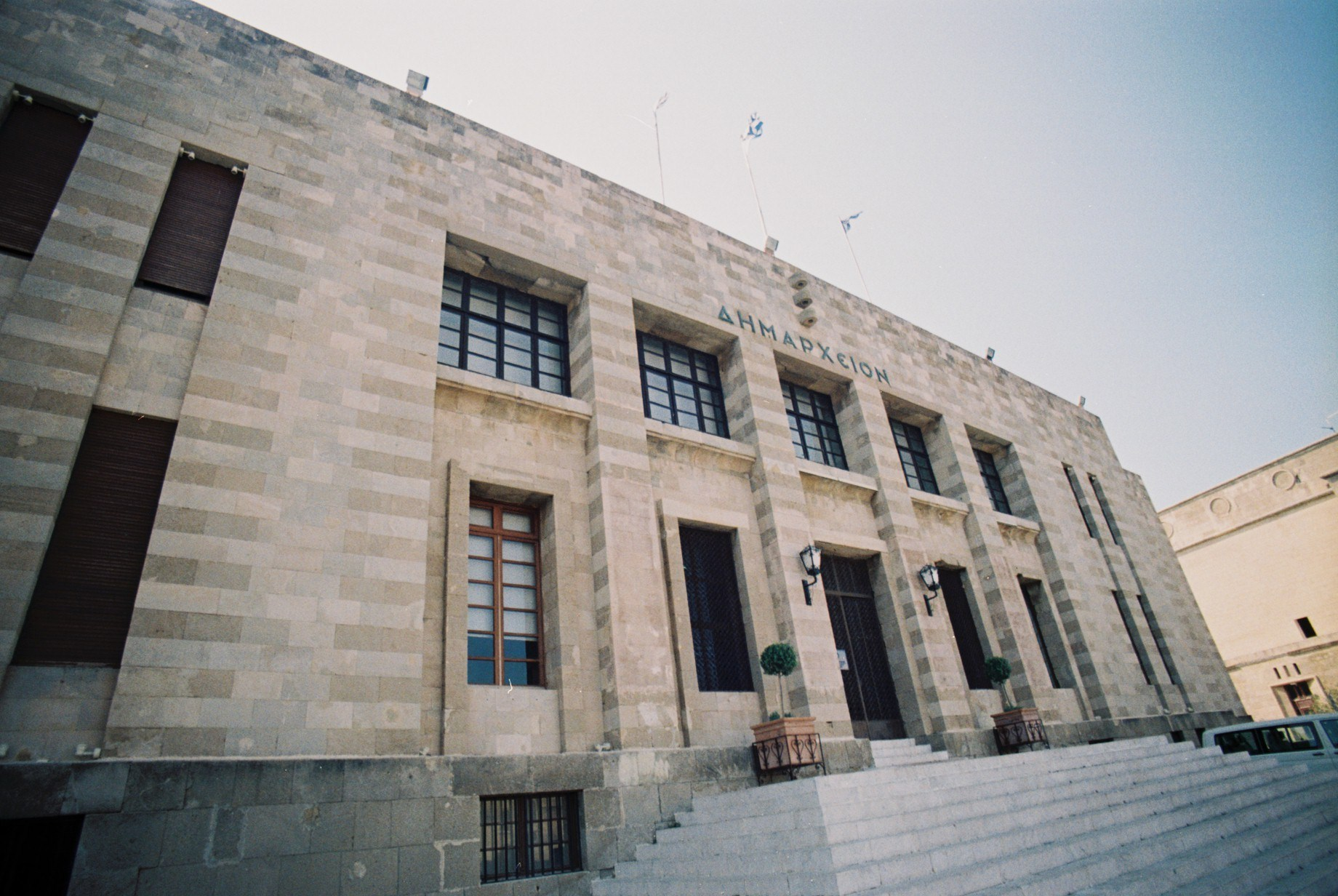
Casa del Fascio (City hall)

Starting in 1923, civil governors replaced the military commanders. The Italian politics towards the native population had two phases: while governor Mario Lago, a liberal diplomat, favoured peaceful coexistence among the different ethnic groups and the Italians, choosing a soft strategy of integration, his successor, Cesare Maria De Vecchi, embarked on a forced Italianization campaign of the islands. Lago delegated land for Italian settlers and encouraged intermarriage with local Greeks. In 1929, scholarships at the University of Pisa for Dodecanesian students were promoted to disseminate Italian culture and language among the local professional class.

The only sector where Lago was unaccommodating was religion: The Italian authorities also tried to limit the power of the Greek Orthodox Church without success by trying to set up an autocephalous Dodecanesian church. Fascist youth organizations such as Opera Nazionale Balilla were introduced on the islands, and the Italianization of names was encouraged by the Italian authorities. The juridic state of the islands was an intermediate one (possedimento) between a colony and a part of the motherland: due to that, local islanders did not receive full citizenship and were not required to serve in the Italian armed forces.

Under the governorship of De Vecchi (1936–40), a staunch and hard line Fascist, the Italianization efforts became very strong. The Italian language became compulsory in education and public life, with Greek being only an optional subject in schools. While under Lago the inhabitants were allowed to elect their own mayors, in 1937 the fascist system was set up on the islands, with a newly appointed podestà for each municipality (comune). In 1938, the Italian racial laws were introduced to the islands along with a series of decrees equalizing local legislation with Italian law.

De Vecchi also linked Rhodes to Italy with a regular air service from the late 1930s. The "Aero Espresso Italiana" (AEI) had flights from Brindisi to Athens and Rhodes with flying boats (AEI used mainly the "Savoia 55", but also the "Macchi 24bis").

=== Italian settlement efforts ===
Efforts to bring Italian settlers to the islands were not notably successful. By 1936, Italians in the Dodecanese numbered 16,711, most of them living on Rhodes and Leros. Italians of Rhodes and Kos were farmers involved in setting up new agricultural settlements, while Italians of Leros were generally employed by the army and lived at its facilities in the new Italian-built model town of Portolago (modern Lakki).

=== Public works ===
Mussolini wanted to transform the islands into showcases of the Italian colonial empire, and undertook a series of massive public works in the archipelago. New roads, monumental buildings in accordance with fascist architecture and waterworks were constructed, sometimes using forced Greek labour.

Many examples of Italian architecture can still be found on the islands: A few among them are:

- The Grande Albergo delle Rose (now "Casino Rodos") built by Florestano Di Fausto and Michele Platania in 1927, with a mix of Arab, Byzantine and Venetian styles.
- The Casa del Fascio of Rhodes, built in 1939 in typical fascist style. It serves now as the City Hall.
- The Catholic church of San Giovanni, built in 1925 by Di Fausto, as a reconstruction of the medieval cathedral church of the Knights of St. John.
- The Teatro Puccini of the city of Rhodes, now called "National Theater", built in 1937 with 1,200 seats.
- The Palazzo del Governatore in downtown Rhodes, built in 1927 in Venetian style by Di Fausto. It now houses the offices of the Prefecture of the Dodecanese.
- The Villaggio rurale San Benedetto, now Kolympia village, built in 1938 as a planned model village with all modern services.
- The Town of Portolago (now Lakki) on the island of Leros, with a Casa del Fascio, Casa del Balilla, school, cinema, Catholic church, and city hall all built in 1938 in characteristic Italian Rationalist style.

The Italians also surveyed the islands for the first time in history, and began to introduce mass-scale tourism to Rhodes and Kos. The smaller islands were mostly neglected by the improvement efforts and were left underdeveloped.

=== Archeology ===
Mussolini stated that Rhodes had merely returned to its ancestral home after being annexed by Italy, as the Dodecanese had been an important part of the Roman Empire. Major Italian archaeological efforts from the 1930s onward were intended to discover Roman antiquities and thus strengthen the Italian claim on the islands.

=== Administrative division ===
Island (Italian name in parentheses)	Area	Population
Rhodes (Rodi) and dependent islets	1,412 km^{2} (545 sq mi)	61,886
Patmos (Patmo), Agathonisi (Gaidaro) and dependent islets	57.1 km^{2} (22.0 sq mi)	3,184
Leros (Lero)	52.9 km^{2} (20.4 sq mi)	13,657
Leipsoi (Lisso)	17.4 km^{2} (6.7 sq mi)	977
Kalymnos (Calino) and dependent islets	128.2 km^{2} (49.5 sq mi)	15,247
Kos (Coo)	296 km^{2} (114 sq mi)	19,731
Astypalaia (Stampalia) and dependent islets	113.6 km^{2} (43.9 sq mi)	2,006
Nisyros (Nisiro) and dependent islets	48 km^{2} (19 sq mi)	3,391
Symi (Simi) and dependent islets	63.6 km^{2} (24.6 sq mi)	6,195
Tilos (Piscopi) and dependent islets	64.3 km^{2} (24.8 sq mi)	1,215
Halki (Calchi) and dependent islets	30.3 km^{2} (11.7 sq mi)	1,461
Karpathos (Scarpanto) and dependent islets	306 km^{2} (118 sq mi)	7,770
Kasos (Caso) and dependent islets	69.4 km^{2} (26.8 sq mi)	1,890
Megisti (Castelrosso) and dependent islets	11.5 km^{2} (4.4 sq mi)	2,238
Totals for Italian Aegean Islands	2,721.2 km^{2} (1,050.7 sq mi)	140,848

Sources: Census of 1936; Annuario Generale, Consociazione Turistica Italiana, Roma, 1938

== Planned expansion ==
After the Battle of Greece, Fascist authorities pushed for the incorporation of the Cyclades and Sporades into Italy's Aegean possessions, but the Germans were opposed to any territorial reduction of the puppet Hellenic State. As the Cyclades were already under Italian occupation, the preparation for outright annexation was continued despite German opposition.

== End of Italian influence ==
Military Administration in the Aegean
- 1945–1947
- Flag Coat of arms
- Largest city: Rhodes
- Chief Administrator
  - 1945–1946: Charles Henry Gormley
  - 1946–1947: Arthur Stanley Parker
Preceded by	Succeeded by
Italian Islands of the Aegean	Kingdom of Greece

After the Italian capitulation of September 1943, the islands briefly became a battleground between the Germans, the British and the Italians (the Dodecanese campaign). The Germans prevailed, and although they were driven out of mainland Greece in 1944, the Dodecanese remained occupied until the end of the war in Europe in 1945. The last German military governor, Generalmajor Otto Wagener, surrendered to the British on 8 May 1945. During the German occupation, the Dodecanese remained under the nominal sovereignty of the Italian Social Republic, but were de facto subject to the German military command. After the end of World War II, the islands came under provisional British administration.

In the Treaty of Paris in 1947, the islands were ceded to Greece.

== See also ==
- Italian colonists in the Dodecanese

== Sources ==
Italian

- Calace, Francesca (a cura di), «Restituiamo la Storia» – dagli archivi ai territori. Architetture e modelli urbani nel Mediterraneo orientale. Gangemi, Roma, 2012 (collana PRIN 2006 «Restituiamo la Storia»)
- Tuccimei, Ercole. La Banca d'Italia in Africa, Foreword by Arnaldo Mauri, Laterza, Bari, 1999.
- Pignataro, Luca. Le Isole Italiane dell'Egeo dall'8 settembre 1943 al termine della seconda guerra mondiale in "Clio. Rivista internazionale di studi storici", 3(2001).
- Pignataro, Luca. Il tramonto del Dodecaneso italiano 1945–1950 in "Clio. Rivista internazionale di studi storici", 4(2001)
- Pignataro, Luca. Ombre sul Dodecaneso italiano, in "Nuova Storia Contemporanea", XII, 3(2008), pp. 61–94
- Pignataro, Luca. Il Dodecaneso italiano, con appendice fotografica, in "Nuova Storia Contemporanea" 2(2010)
- Pignataro, Luca. La presenza cattolica in Dodecaneso tra 1924 e 1937, in "Nova Historica" 32(2010)
- Pignataro, Luca. Il collegio rabbinico di Rodi, in "Nuova Storia Contemporanea", 6(2011)
- Pignataro, Luca. I naufraghi del Pentcho, in "Nuova Storia Contemporanea", 1(2012)
- Pignataro, Luca. Il Dodecaneso italiano 1912–1947, vol. I: L'occupazione iniziale 1912–1922, Chieti, Solfanelli, 2011
