= Italians in Greece =

Italians in Greece may refer to:

- Corfiot Italians
- Italian colonists in the Dodecanese
