= Partition of Albania =

1913 delineation of the new Albanian state

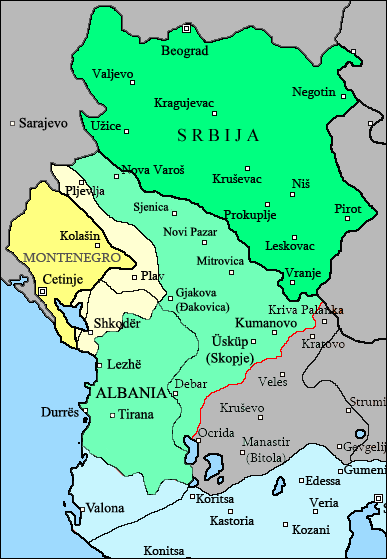
Occupation of Albania by Serbia, Montenegro, and Greece during the First Balkan War

Map of the proposed Albanian state by the provisional government of Principality of Albania, compared to proposal of the Balkan League together with French and Russia and the fixed borders by the Ambassadors and Boundary Commission.

The Partition of Albania (Albanian: Copëtimi i Shqipërisë) is a term used for the partition of the Albanian state, which proclaimed its independence on 28 November 1912. The delineation of the newly established Principality of Albania under the terms of the London Conference of 1912–1913 (29 July 1913) and the Ambassadors of the six Great Powers of that time (Great Britain, France, Germany, Austria-Hungary, Russia and Italy) left Albanian and non-Albanian populations on both sides of the border. Representatives of the Albanian National Movement viewed this as a partition of claimed Albanian-inhabited territories, also territories contained in a proposed Albanian Vilayet.

After the establishment of the Albanian state, there were plans to further partition Albania during World War I; however, Albania was not partitioned and maintained its independent existence. Additional plans of partition were negotiated during and after World War II.

== History ==
=== Prelude ===
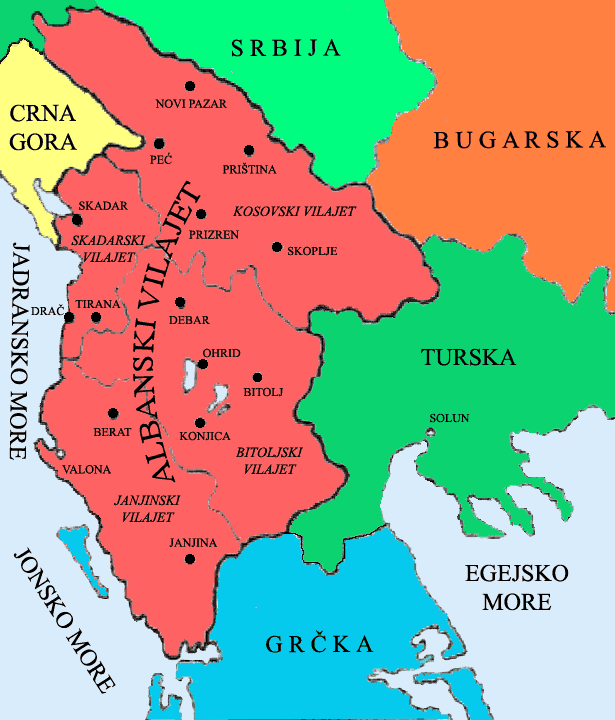
The four Ottoman vilayets clearly divided (vilayet of İşkodra, Yannina, Monastir and Kosovo as proposed by the League of Prizren for full autonomy)

The 1877-1878 Russo-Turkish War severely contracted the Ottoman possessions in the Balkan Peninsula, leaving the empire with only a precarious hold on Macedonia and the western Balkans. Albanians had been under Ottoman Empire since 1479 with the fall of Shkodër. The region claimed by Albanian national leader was ethnically heterogeneous, consisting of large areas inhabited also by Bulgarians, Greeks, Serbians, Turks and Aromanians, though Sami Frashëri (or Şemseddin Sami) claimed that Albanians were the majority of the population in the four vilayets of İşkodra, Yannina, Monastir and Kosovo. The first postwar treaty, the abortive Treaty of San Stefano signed on 3 March 1878, assigned Albanian-populated lands to Serbia, Montenegro, and Bulgaria. Austria-Hungary and the United Kingdom blocked the arrangement because it awarded Russia a predominant position in the Balkans and thereby upset the European balance of power. A peace conference to settle the dispute was held later in the year in Berlin. The Congress of Berlin ceded to Montenegro the cities of Bar and Podgorica and areas around the mountain villages of Gusinje and Plav, which Albanian leaders considered Albanian territory, and viewed this as a partition of Albanian-inhabited territories. In February 1879, the Powers insisted that the Porte give up the Albanian-claimed areas of Plava, Podgorica, Gucia and Ulcinj, and withdraw all Ottoman troops from the disputed zones.

=== Congress of Berlin ===
The Congress of Berlin was the partition of some of the Albanian-inhabited territories, which Albanians considered to be part of the Albanian Vilayet. The congress ceded to Montenegro the cities of Bar and Podgorica and areas around the mountain villages of Gusinje and Plav. The Albanians created the League of Prizren to counter the loss of territories where Albanians were a majority, and organized armed resistance efforts in Gusinje and Plav, where the Montenegrin forces were met by fierce resistance. A border tribesman at the time described the frontier as "floating on blood". Seeing the resistance, the Congress decided to give Ulcinj to Montenegro. The League of Prizren was forced to retreat from Ulcinj, after being crushed by the Ottoman army led by Dervish Pasha.

=== Balkan Wars ===
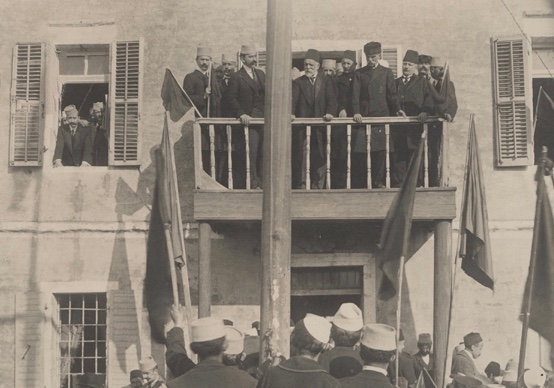
Albanian Declaration of Independence in Vlorë 1912.

On 8 October 1912, Montenegrin troops marched in the vilayet of Shkodra. That was followed by Serbia, Bulgaria, and Greece to declare war on Ottoman Empire, thus starting the First Balkan War. Montenegrin, Serbian and Greek forces advanced in territories which were majorly populated by Albanians, and tried to change the ethnic reality through extermination of the Albanian population, with around 25 000 Albanians killed by early 1913. Alarmed at the plans of Montenegro, Serbia and Greece to partition between them the territories of the western Balkans, the Albanians delegates met at a congress in Vlorë, where on 28 November 1912 declared the independence of Albania.

On 3 December 1912, the ambassadors of the six Great Powers of that time (Great Britain, France, Germany, Austria-Hungary, Russia and Italy) met in London to decide about the fate of the Albanian-inhabited territories. After much discussion, the Ambassadors reached a formal decision on 29 July 1913 to establish the Principality of Albania which independence would be recognized, It was agreed by the Great Powers that Serbia would not extend to the coast and that an Albanian state would be created. Austria-Hungary argued that all Albanian inhabited lands should be included in it but was opposed by France and Russia. More than half of the territory of the Independent Albania and about 30%-40% of the ethnic Albanian population would be awarded to Serbia, Montenegro, and Greece. Though deprived of more than half of its ethnic territory, Albania would be a sovereign state independent of the Ottoman Empire.

=== Delineation of the Albanian border ===
A number of boundary commissions were sent to Albania in order to delineate the borders of the new state, on an ethnographic basis, according to the terms of the London Peace Conferences. However, the commission being unable to delineate the area of southern Albania on such a basis, fell back upon economic, strategic and geographical arguments for the delimitation of the southern border. As a result, most of the disputed area was left to Albania. This decision catalyzed an uprising among the local Greek population, which declared the population of the region that was temporary settled by the Protocol of Corfu.

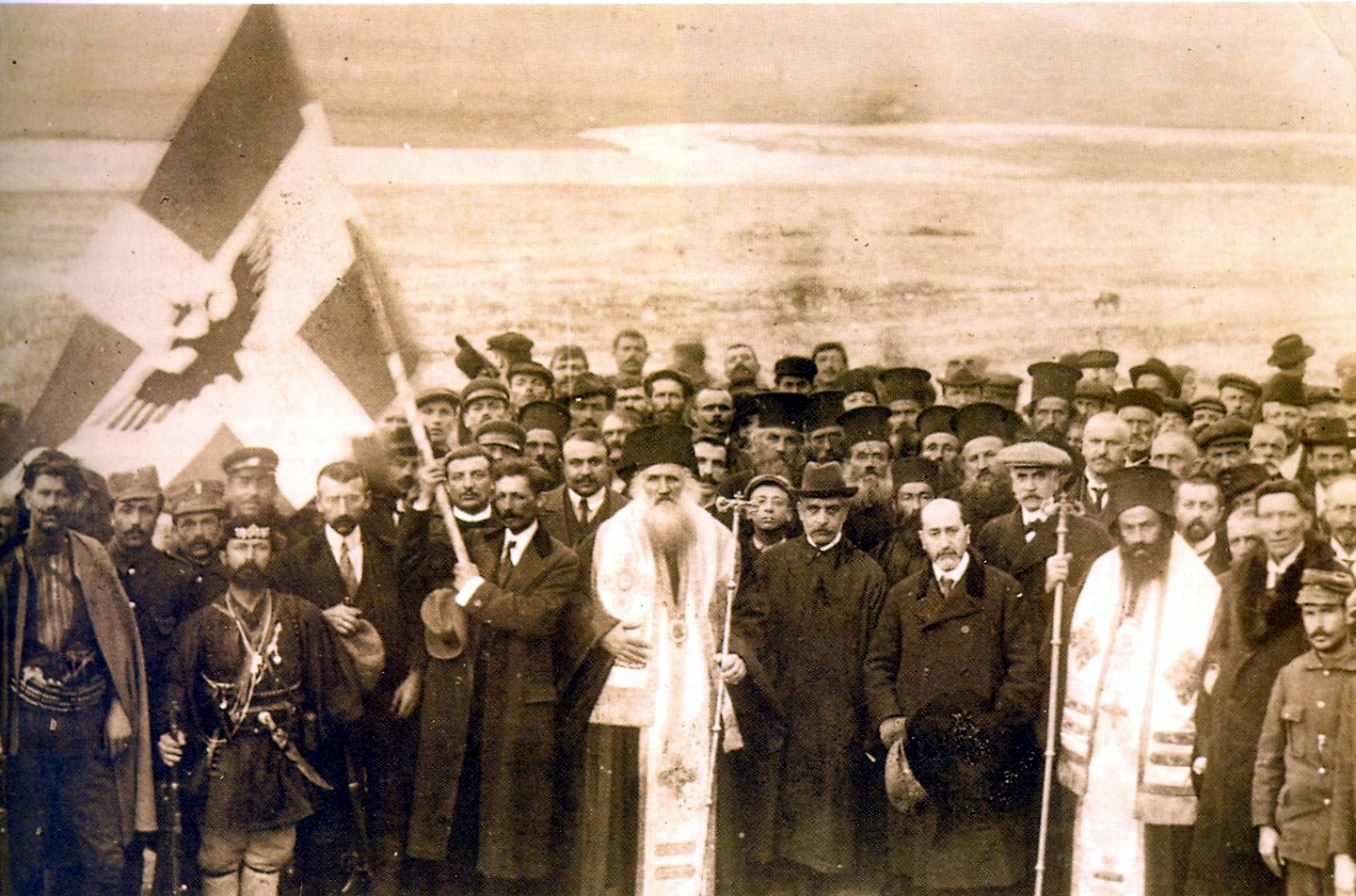
Declaration of the Northern Epirote Independence in Gjirokastër, against annexation of the region to the newly established Albanian state.

== Plans for further partition of Albania ==
After the establishment of the Albanian state, in 1912, there were plans to further partition Albania during World War I. In 1915, a secret treaty signed in London included the partitioning of the country, As part of this treaty, in 1919 an agreement was signed between Italy and Greece that included plans of annexation of Albania between the two countries. According to this agreement, known as Venizelos–Tittoni agreement, signed on 20 July 1919, Northern Epirus (parts of southern Albania) would be incorporated to Greece, while Greece would recognize an Italian mandate for central Albania.

Before the Italian invasion of Albania in 1939, there were discussions concerning partition between Yugoslavia and Italy. On the other hand, in 1944, while Albania came under communist control, a resolution of the United States Senate supported the cession of Northern Epirus to Greece.

== Aftermath ==
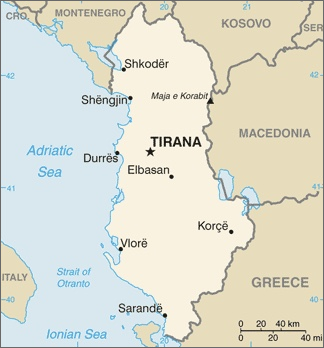
Any plans of partition of the Albanian state were unsuccessful and Albania retained its 1913 territories (pictured).

The borders of the Principality of Albania established in 1913 left a large number of ethnic Albanians outside the new state, and many of them fled or were forcibly driven inside the recognized borders of Albania. In Kosovo, Serbian troops attempted to alter the demographic makeup of the region through mass expulsions. Over 100,000 Albanians were expelled from Kosovo during 1918-1941.

== See also ==
- League of Prizren
- History of Albania
- Albanian Declaration of Independence
- Albanian nationalism
- Albania during the Balkan Wars
