= Galatina =

Galatina Ας Πέτρο (Greek) San Pietru (Sicilian)
- Comune
- Comune di Galatina
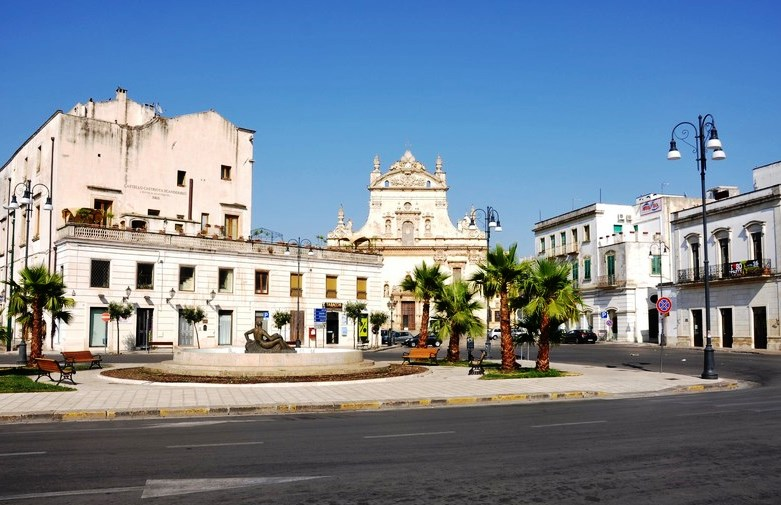

- Location within Italy Location within Apulia
- Coordinates: 40°10′N 18°10′E
- Country: Italy
- Region: Apulia
- Province: Lecce (LE)
- Frazioni: Collemeto, Noha, Santa Barbara

Government
  - Mayor: Fabio Vergine

Area
  - Total: 82.65 km^{2} (31.91 sq mi)
- Elevation: 78 m (256 ft)

Population (31 December 2017)
  - Total: 26,887
  - Density: 325.3/km^{2} (842.6/sq mi)
- Demonym: Galatinesi
- Time zone: UTC+1 (CET)
  - Summer (DST): UTC+2 (CEST)
- Postal code: 73013
- Dialing code: 0836
- ISTAT code: 075029
- Patron saint: St. Peter and St. Paul
- Saint day: 29 and 30 June
- Website: Official website

Galatina (Griko: Ας Πέτρο, romanized: As Pètro; Salentino: San Pietru; both lit. 'Saint Peter'), known before the unification of Italy as San Pietro in Galatina, is a town and comune (municipality) in the Province of Lecce in Apulia, southern Italy. It is situated about 21 kilometres (13 mi) south of the city of Lecce.

== Main sights ==
- The late Romanesque church of Santa Caterina d'Alessandria, built in 1390 by Raimondello del Balzo Orsini, count of Soleto, with a fine portal and rose window. The interior contains frescoes by Francesco d'Arezzo (1435). The apse contains the fine mausoleum of the son of the founder, a canopy supported by four columns, with his statue beneath.
- The Baroque church of San Pietro (also known as Mother Church), rebuilt from 1633 on a previous Greek-rite edifice.
- The Saint Paul Chapel. It houses a well which, according to tradition, was able to heal people bitten by poisonous tarantulas (those bitten are called tarantati or pizzicati in the local dialect). See also Tarantism.
- The Pupa, a fountain in local limestone
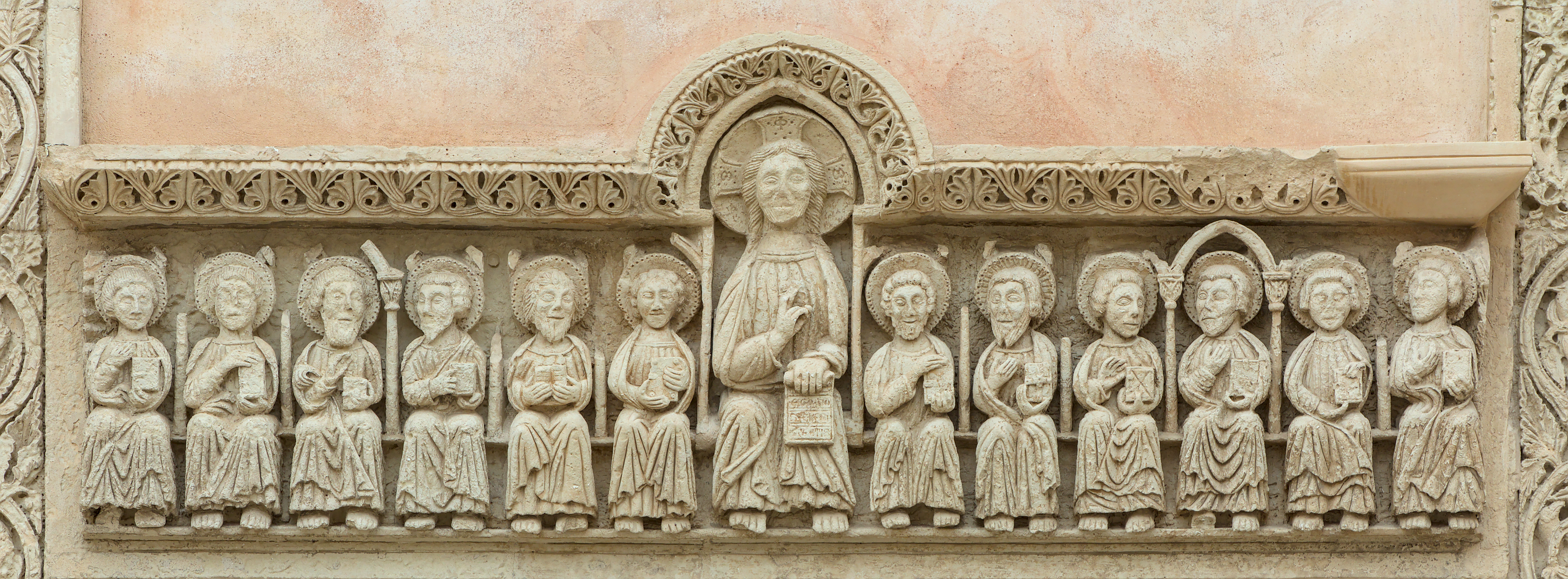
Christ and 12 apostles, on the lintel of the portal of Santa Caterina d'Alessandria

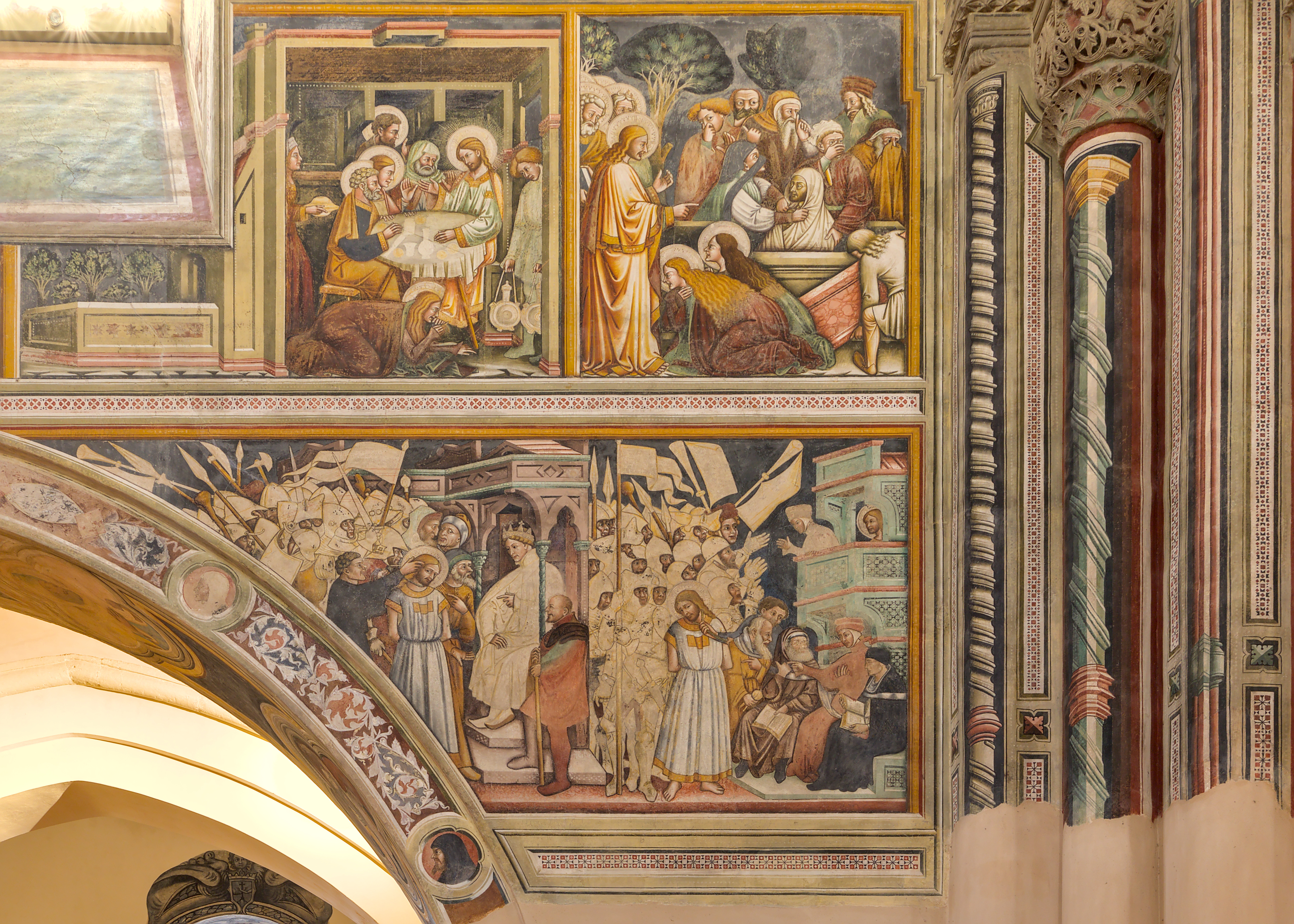
Frescoes depicting New testament scenes, inside Santa Caterina d'Alessandria

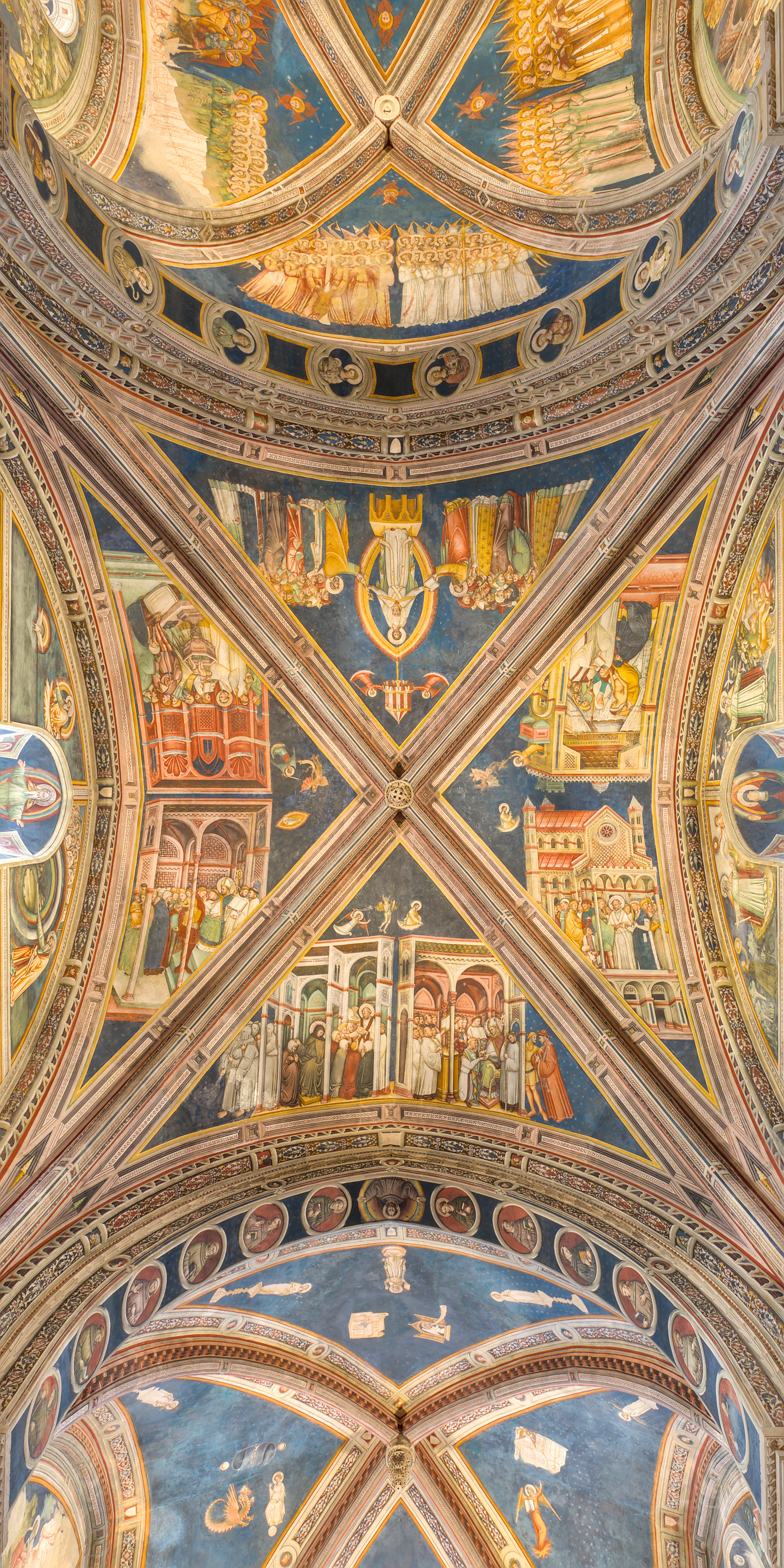
Frescoes depicting the Seven Sacraments, on the ceiling of Santa Caterina d'Alessandria

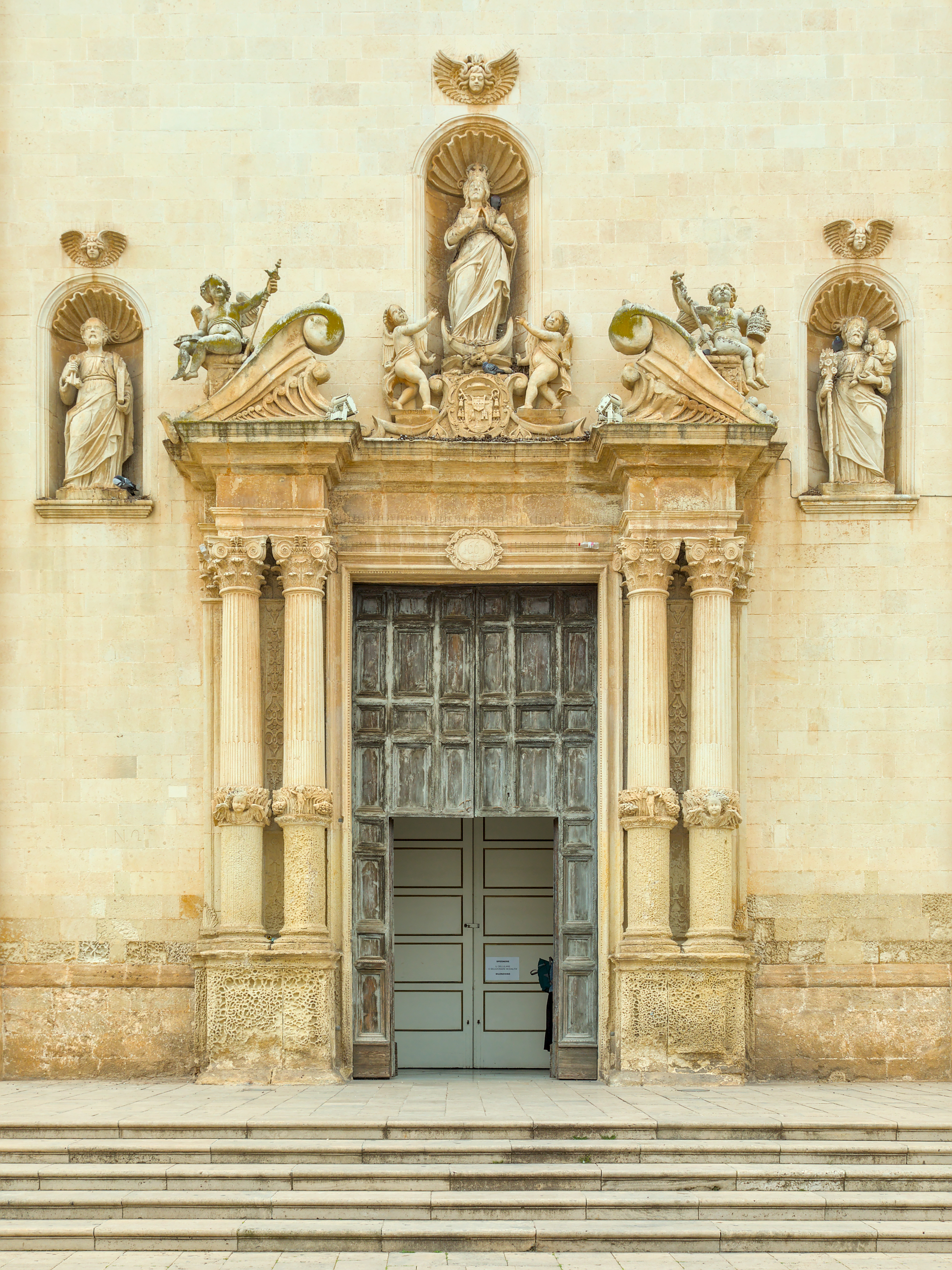
Portal of Galatina - Santi Pietro e Paolo

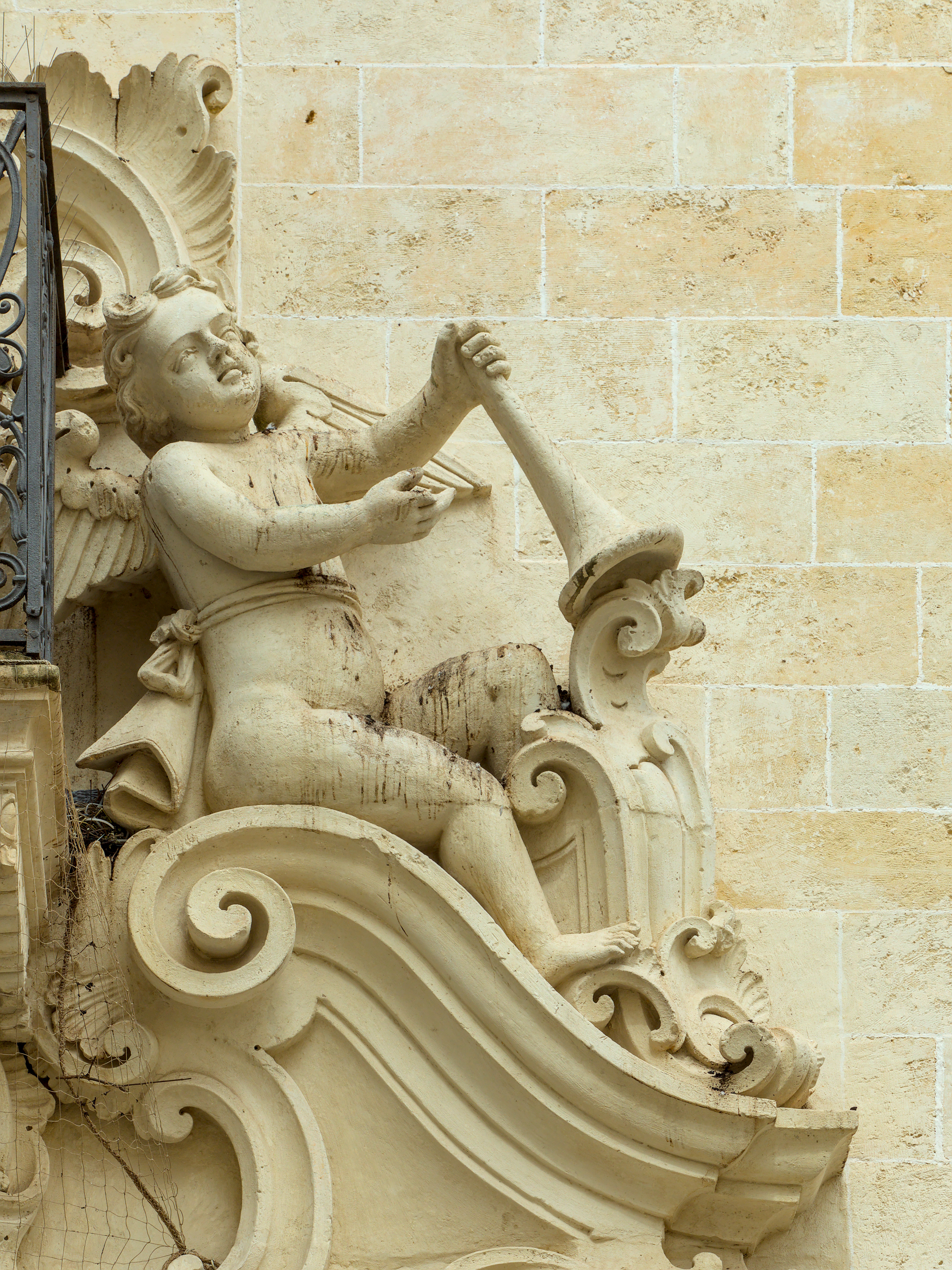
Sculpture of an angel on the façade of Palazzo Bardoscia Lubelli Spoti (18th c.)

== Transportation ==
Galatina has a station on the Ferrovie Sud-Est line to Lecce. Road connections include the SS16 Adriatica state highway, the SS101 state road, also to Lecce, and the SS 613 Brindisi-Lecce highway.

== Energy ==
Near Galatina is the static inverter plant of HVDC Italy–Greece.

== Twin towns ==
- (Bosnia and Herzegovina) Novi Grad, Bosnia-Herzegovina, since 1997
- Sapes, Greece, since 1999
