= HVDC Italy–Greece =

HVDC interconnection between Italy and Greece

- Location of HVDC Italy–Greece

Location
- Country: Italy, Greece
- Coordinates: 40°9′53″N 18°7′49″E; 39°41′00″N 20°1′09″E; 39°40′28″N 20°04′05″E; 39°40′44″N 20°4′28″E; 39°11′00″N 20°57′48″E
- General direction: west–east–west (bidirectional)
- From: Galatina (Italy)
- Passes through: Ionian Sea
- To: Arachthos (Epirus, Greece)

Ownership information
- Partners: Terna, HTSO

Construction information
- Cable manufacturer: ABB
- Commissioned: 2001

Technical information
- Type: submarine cable; overhead line
- Current type: HVDC
- Total length: 313 km (194 mi)
- Capacity: 500 MW
- AC voltage: 400 kV (both ends)
- DC voltage: 400 kV
- No. of poles: 1

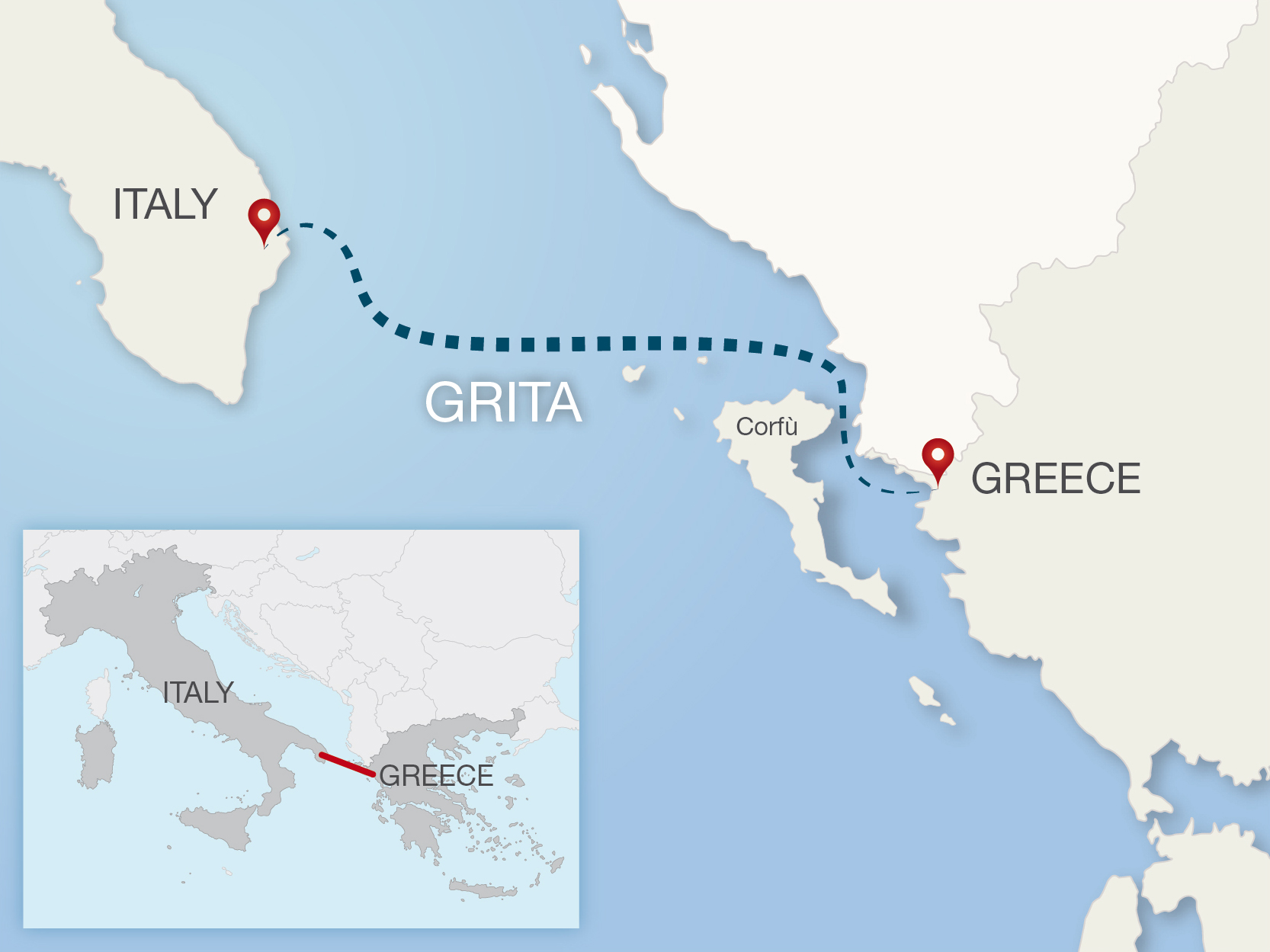

The HVDC Italy–Greece is a monopolar submarine power cable link between Italy and Greece with a maximum transmission power of 500 megawatts. It went in service in 2001.

The HVDC Italy–Greece begins in the static inverter plant Galatina situated at 40°9′53″N 18°7′49″E in Italy and is implemented in its first 43 kilometres (27 mi) as underground cables. Then it crosses the Ionian Sea as a 160 kilometres (99 mi) long submarine cable. It reaches shore just a few kilometres south of Albanian border at 39°41′00″N 20°1′09″E, where the 110 kilometres (68 mi) long overhead line to Arachthos static inverter station situated at 39°11′00″N 20°57′48″E starts. The cathode is implemented as bare copper wire on the Italian site, the anode is installed in a bay in Greece at 39°40′28″N 20°4′05″E.

== Sites ==
Site	Coordinates
Galatina HVDC Static Inverter	40°09′53″N 18°07′49″E
Greek Cable Terminal	39°41′00″N 20°01′09″E
Anode	39°40′28″N 20°04′05″E
Greek Overhead Electrode Line Cable Branch	39°40′44″N 20°4′28″E
Arachthos HVDC Static Inverter	39°11′00″N 20°57′48″E
