= Mario Lago =

Italian statesman and diplomat

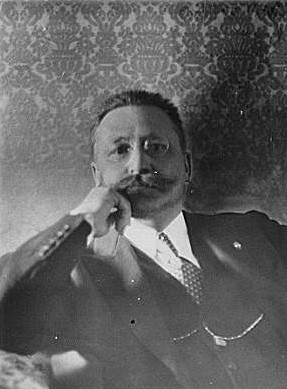
Portrait photograph of Mario Rodi Lago, 1929

Mario Lago (1878 in Peveragno – 1950 in Capri) was an Italian statesman and diplomat.

== Biography ==
Originally from the town of Peveragno, Lago was Governor of the Italian Aegean Islands from 1922 to 1936. His term of office is characterized by a far-sighted policy and respect for ethnic and cultural identity of the inhabitants of the colony. He was able to integrate the Greek, Turkish and Sephardic Jewish communities of the island of Rhodes with the Italian colonists. He also encouraged intermarriage with local Greeks. This period constituted what might in retrospective be called the "Golden Age" of the Italian Dodecanese, with the economy booming and a relatively harmonious society.

Lago also developed a large plan of public works in Rhodes and other islands. As part of these plans, the new city of Portolago (present-day Lakki) was built as the base of the Italian Royal Navy on the island of Leros, as well as the agricultural village of Peveragno Rodio, a center of settlement of Italian colonists.

== See also ==
- Italian Aegean Islands
