= Venizelos–Tittoni agreement =

Secret agreement between Italy and Greece

The Venizelos–Tittoni agreement was a secret non-binding agreement between the Prime Minister of Greece, Eleftherios Venizelos, and the Italian Minister of Foreign Affairs, Tommaso Tittoni, in July 1919, during the Paris Peace Conference.

== Main terms ==
The agreement was an effort to achieve an agreement about the conflicting territorial claims of the two countries.

- Greece pledged to support the Italian claims over Vlorë and the establishment of an Italian protectorate over Albania. In Asia Minor, Greece would support the Italian claims over the parts of the sanjaks of Aydın and Menteshe, which were not already captured by the Greek army. A line of demarcation between Greek and Italian zones was drawn in the Maeander River valley. Greece would also secure a free zone for Italy at the port of Smyrna (under Greek administration from May 1919).
- Italy pledged to support the Greek territorial claims over Northern Epirus and transfer the Dodecanese to Greece, except for the island of Rhodes, which would remain under Italian rule until such time as Cyprus would be ceded to Greece by Britain, at which time a referendum would be held for union with Greece.

== Developments ==
In January 1920, Venizelos made known the agreement to the Supreme Allied Council with no negative reaction. The stance of Italy changed in July 1920, when the new Italian Minister of Foreign Affairs, Carlo Sforza, with a secret note to the Greek government renounced the agreement. Formally, the agreement was renounced by Italy in August 1922.

== See also ==
- Zone of Smyrna
- Treaty of Sèvres
- Partition of Albania
- Partitioning of the Ottoman Empire

== Sources ==
- L'Accordo Tittoni-Venizelos
