= Southern Sporades =

Island group in Greece

Native name: Νότιες Σποράδες
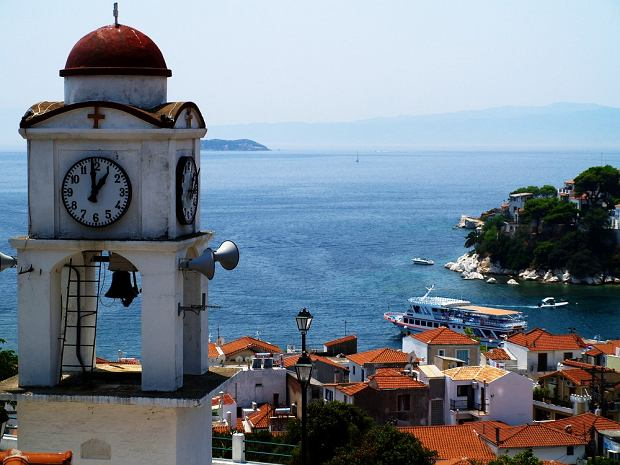
- A landscape view of one of the islands of the Southern Sporades archipelago.

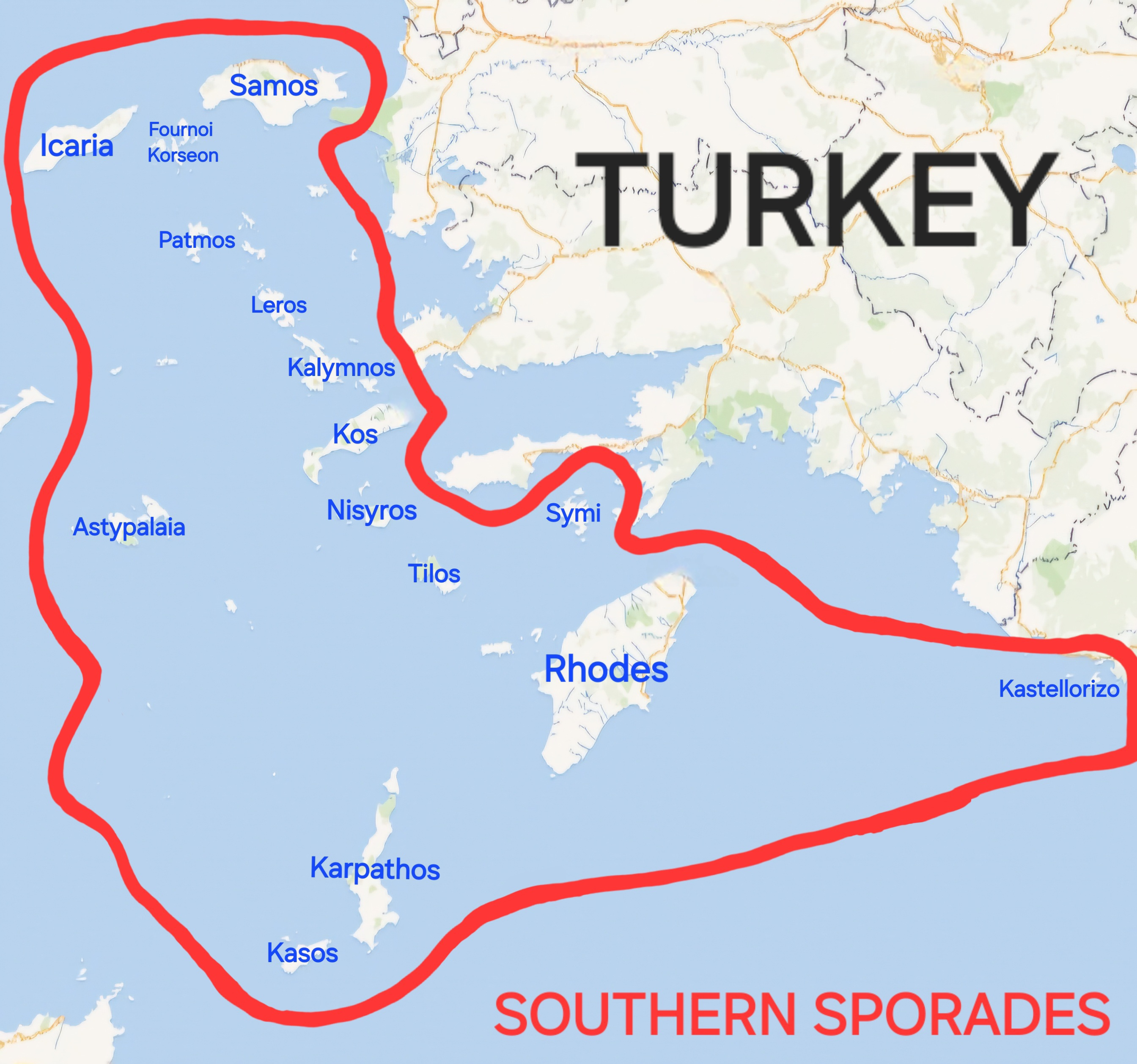

Geography
- Location: Aegean Sea
- Archipelago: Southern Sporades
- Total islands: 165
- Major islands: Agathonisi; Alimia; Arkoi; Armathia; Astypalaia; Farmakonisi; Fournoi Korseon; Gyali; Halki; Icaria; Imia; Kalolimnos; Kalymnos; Karpathos; Kasos; Kastellorizo; Kinaros; Kos; Leipsoi; Leros; Levitha; Nimos; Nisyros; Patmos; Pserimos; Rhodes; Ro; Samos; Saria; Strongyli; Symi; Syrna; Telendos; Tilos
- Area: 3,492.57 km^{2} (1,348.49 sq mi)
- Highest elevation: 1,433 m (4701 ft)
- Highest point: Mount Kerkis

Administration
- Greece
- Region: North Aegean, South Aegean
- Largest settlement: Rhodes (pop. 86,199)

Demographics
- Population: 232,534 (2021)
- Pop. density: 66.6/km^{2} (172.5/sq mi)

The Southern Sporades (Greek: Νότιες Σποράδες, romanized: Nóties Sporádes) are Greek islands situated between the Cyclades and Turkey. They correspond to the Dodecanese plus a few northern islands (especially Samos, Icaria and Fournoi Korseon).

== Geography ==
These islands geographically lie on the border between Europe and Asia.

== List of islands ==
Below is a table presenting the individual islands of the Southern Sporades archipelago and their geographical affiliation to Europe or Asia.

Island	Surface (km²)	Population	Density (/km²)	Continent	Coordinates	Image
Agathonisi; Αγαθονήσι	14.50	190	13	Asia	37°27′49″N 26°58′09″E	
Alimia; Αλιμιά	7.40	0	0	Asia	36°16′30″N 27°42′35″E	
Arkoi; Αρκοί	6.70	44	7	Asia	37°23′N 26°44′E	
Armathia; Αρμάθια	2.60	0	0	Europe	35°26′12″N 26°51′49″E	
Astypalaia; Αστυπάλαια	96.90	1,238	13	Europe	36°33′25.99″N 26°18′57.10″E	
Farmakonisi; Φαρμακονήσι	3.87	74	19	Asia	37°17′28″N 27°05′19″E	
Fournoi Korseon; Φούρνοι Κορσέων	45.25	1,469	32	Asia	37°34′N 26°30′E	
Gyali; Γυαλί	4.56	10	2	Asia	36°39′52.92″N 27°07′12.97″E	
Halki; Χάλκη	28	313	11	Asia	36°13′59.99″N 27°34′00.01″E	
Icaria; Ικαρία	255.30	8,843	35	Asia	37°35′N 26°10′E	
Imia (Note: Imia as one of the islands of the archipelago is claimed by Turkey.); Ίμια	0.04	0	0	Asia	37°03′03″N 27°09′04″E	
Kalolimnos; Καλόλιμνος	1.19	2	2	Asia	37°03′40″N 27°05′15″E	
Kalymnos; Κάλυμνος	109	16,500	151	Asia	36°59′17.84″N 26°58′56.71″E	
Karpathos; Κάρπαθος	300	6,226	19	Europe	35°35′07.08″N 27°07′42.96″E	
Kasos; Κάσος	69.50	990	14	Europe	35°23′22.60″N 26°54′49.54″E	
Kastellorizo; Καστελλόριζο	11.98	492	50	Asia	36°08′42″N 29°35′06″E	
Kinaros; Κίναρος	4.50	1	0.22	Europe	36°58′49″N 26°17′23″E	
Kos; Κως	290	26,000	90	Asia	36°50′16.33″N 27°09′39.42″E	
Leipsoi; Λειψοί	17.35	790	46	Asia	37°18′N 26°45′E	
Leros; Λέρος	74.17	7,917	107	Asia	37°09′22.6843″N 26°51′05.9083″E	
Levitha; Λέβιθα	9.12	13	1	Asia	37°00′40″N 26°27′35″E	
Nimos; Νίμος	4.60	0	0	Asia	36°35′N 27°50′E	
Nisyros; Νίσυρος	50.06	1,008	20	Asia	36°35′43.5077″N 27°09′42.3666″E	
Patmos; Πάτμος	34.60	3,047	89	Asia	37°19′N 26°30′E	
Pserimos; Ψέριμος	14.60	130	9	Asia	36°56′00″N 27°08′00″E	
Rhodes; Ρόδος	1,401.46	115,490	82	Asia	36°10′N 28°00′E	
Ro; Ρω	1.60	15	9	Asia	36°09′19.0001″N 29°29′49.9999″E	
Samos; Σάμος	476	42,000	90	Asia	37°44′09.49″N 26°47′44.34″E	
Saria; Σαρία	21.10	22	1	Europe	35°51′44.85″N 27°13′17.42″E	
Strongyli; Στρογγυλή	0.90	1	1	Asia	36°6′50″N 29°38′12″E	
Symi; Σύμη	58.10	2,606	45	Asia	36°35′37.50″N 27°50′03.16″E	
Syrna; Σύρνα	4	0	0	Europe	36°20.33′N 26°40.38′E	
Telendos; Τέλενδος	8.50	66	8	Asia	37°00′N 26°55′E	
Tilos; Τήλος	64.50	553	8	Asia	36°25′59.99″N 27°22′00.01″E	

== See also ==
- Sporades
- Dodecanese
- Northern Sporades
- Saronic Islands
- Eastern Sporades
- Thracian Sporades
- North Aegean islands
