= Lepsimandus =

Island and ancient city off coast of Caria

Coordinates: 37°05′29″N 27°03′43″E

Lepsimandus or Lepsimandos (Ancient Greek: Ληψίμανδος) was a city of ancient Caria, mentioned by Stephanus of Byzantium. Lepsimandus was located on an island of the same name in the Aegean Sea. Lepsimandus was a polis (city-state) and member of the Delian League. It appears in the Athenian tribute lists and paid an annual tribute of 17 drachmae, 1 obol.

Its site is located on Kalolimnos.
