= Pserimos =

Greek island in the Aegean Sea

Native name: Ψέριμος
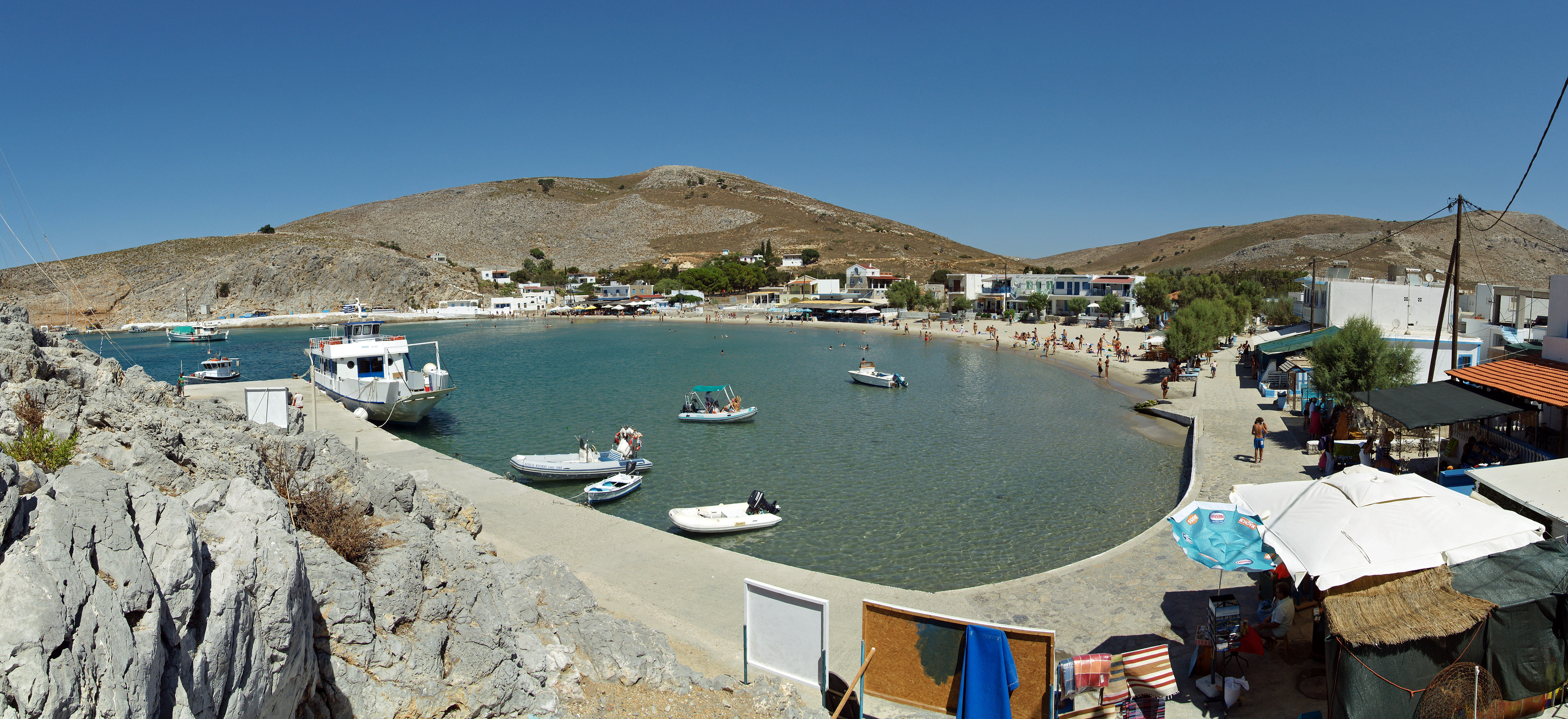
- The island of Pserimos

- Location within Greece

Geography
- Location: Aegean Sea
- Coordinates: 36°56′0″N 27°8′0″E
- Archipelago: Dodecanese

Administration
- Greece
- Administrative region: South Aegean
- Regional unit: Kalymnos
- Municipality: Kalymnos

Demographics
- Population: 84 (2021)

Pserimos (Greek: Ψέριμος, Modern Greek pronunciation: [ˈpserimos]) is a small Greek island in the Dodecanese chain, lying between Kalymnos and Kos near the coast of Turkey. It is part of the municipality of Kalymnos. According to the Hellenic Statistical Authority, the island had a population of 84 inhabitants in the 2021 Greek census.

The main industry is tourism, with Greek and other European visitors attracted by its remote location and beaches. There are a number of taverns on the island, some of which offer accommodation.

Pserimos is served by a daily ferry from Pothia, on the island of Kalymnos, and is also a destination on the itinerary of several cruise boats in the area.
