= Imia =

Unpopulated islet in southeastern Aegean

Disputed islands
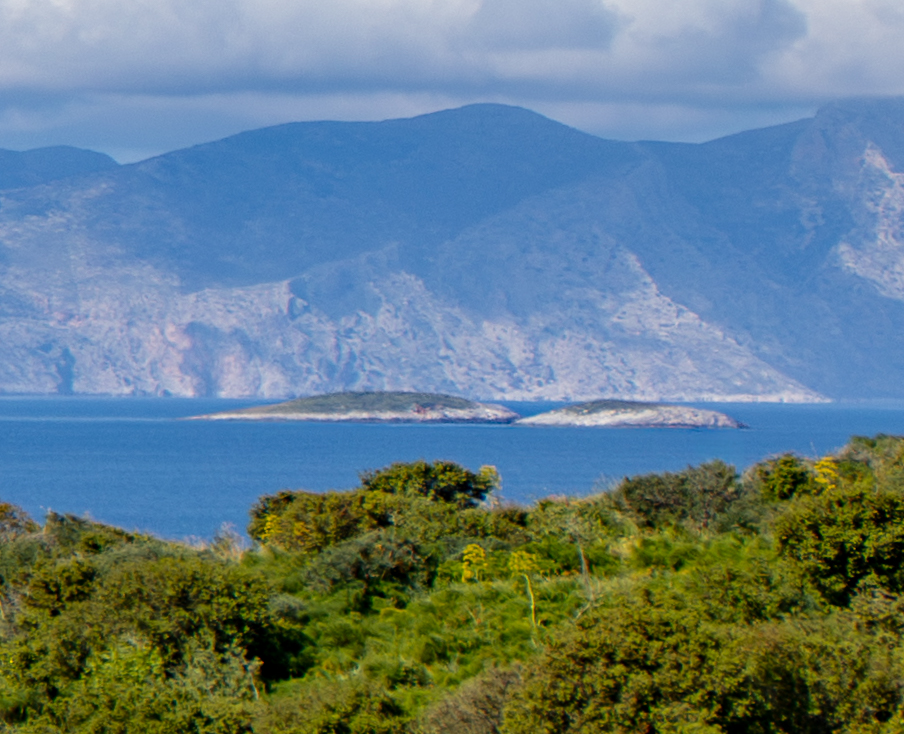

- Location within Greece Location within Turkey
- Other names: Kardak, Limnia, İkizce, Heipethes

Geography
- Location: Aegean Sea
- Coordinates: 37°03′03″N 27°09′04″E
- Total islands: 2
- Area: 4 ha (9.9 acres)

Claimed by
- Greece
- Turkey

Demographics
- Population: 0

Imia (Greek: Ίμια) is a pair of small uninhabited islets in the Aegean Sea, situated between the Greek island chain of the Dodecanese and the southwestern mainland coast of Turkey. They are known in Turkey as Kardak.

Imia was the object of a military crisis and subsequent dispute over sovereignty between Greece and Turkey in 1996. The Imia dispute is part of the larger Aegean dispute, which also comprises disputes over the continental shelf, the territorial waters, the air space, the Flight Information Regions (FIR) and the demilitarization of the Aegean islands. In the aftermath of the Imia crisis, the dispute was also widened, as Turkey began to lay parallel claims to a larger number of other islets in the Aegean. These islands, some of them inhabited, are regarded as indisputably Greek by Greece but as grey zones of undetermined sovereignty by Turkey.

== Geography ==
The islets lie 5.5 nautical miles (10.2 km; 6.3 mi) east of the Greek island Kalymnos, 1.9 nmi (3.5 km; 2.2 mi) southeast of the Greek island of Kalolimnos, 3.8 nmi (7.0 km; 4.4 mi) west of the Turkish peninsula of Bodrum, and 2.2 nmi (4.1 km; 2.5 mi) from the Turkish islet of Çavuş Adası. The islets lie some 300 m (1,000 ft) apart from each other, the eastern one being slightly larger than the western one. Their total surface area is 10 acres (4.0 ha).

The islands are also referred to as Limnia (Λίμνια) in Greek, or İkizce in Turkish, or as Heipethes in some early-20th century maps. The toponym "Kardak" is believed to come from the Greek "Kar(y)dakia", i.e. "small walnuts", because of their shape.

== Background ==
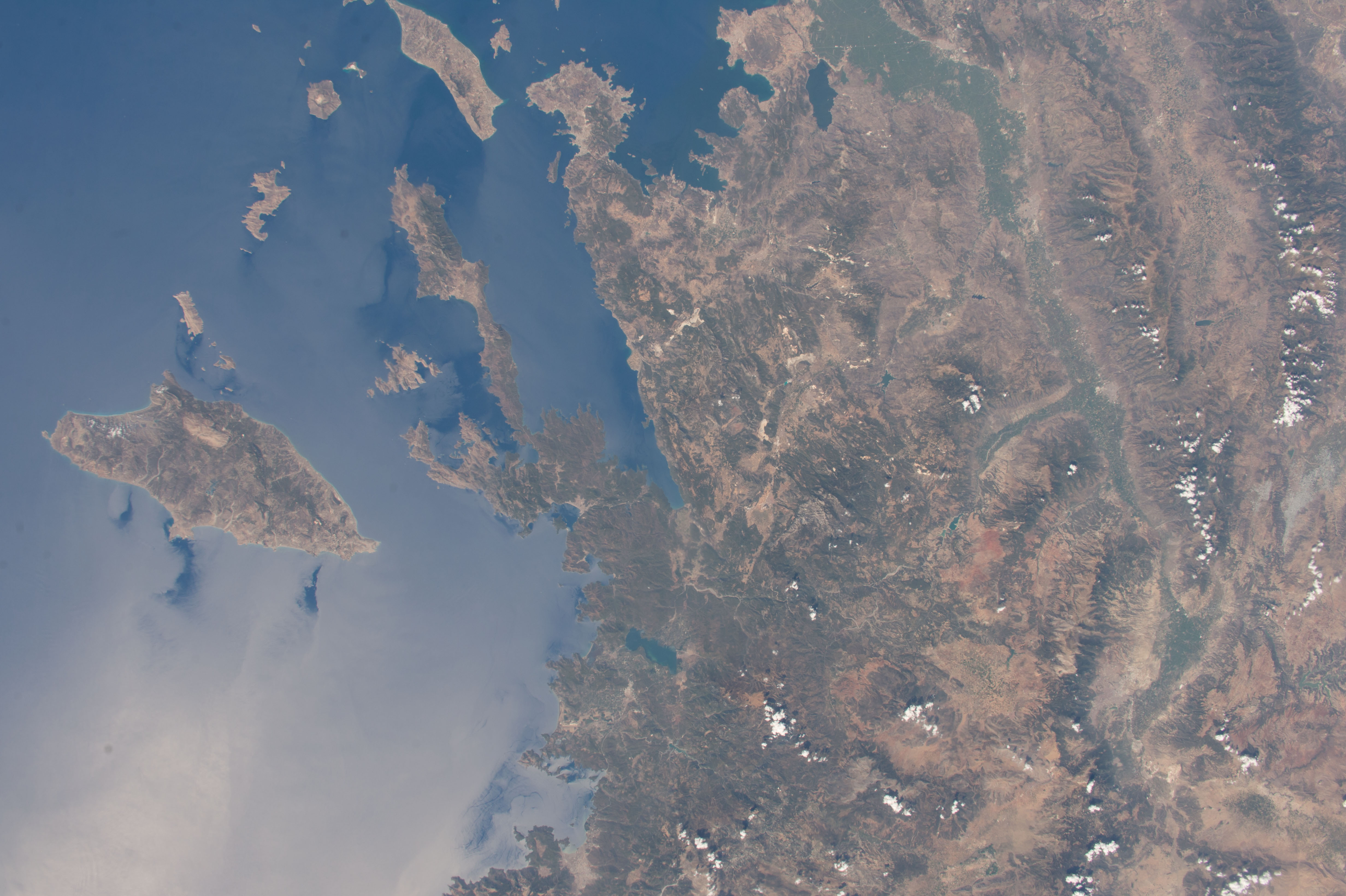
An image of Dodecanese and Anatolian coasts. Imia is on the northernmost edge of the photo. Click to the photo to enlarge.

While several other aspects of sovereignty rights in the Aegean, such as the territorial waters and national airspace, had been disputed between the two countries for decades, conflicts over the possession of island territory were unknown until the end of 1995. The dispute over Imia arose when, on 26 December 1995, the Turkish cargo ship Figen Akat accidentally ran aground on the east islet and had to be salvaged.

A Greek tugboat responded to the distress call. The Turkish captain initially refused the assistance offered, maintaining that he was within Turkish territorial waters. He ultimately accepted being towed to the Turkish port of Güllük by the Greek tugboat. The Greek captain filled in the necessary papers for the salvage fee but the Turkish captain objected, arguing that the freighter had been in Turkish waters.

On 27 December, the Turkish Foreign Ministry notified the Greek authorities that it believed there was a sovereignty issue, and on 29 December it declared the islets Turkish territory. On January 9, Athens rejected the claim, citing the Treaty of Lausanne (1923), the Convention between Italy and Turkey (1932) and the Treaty of Paris (1947).

The whole event was barely reported in the media so it was not widely known to public until a month later, on 20 January 1996 when the Greek magazine GRAMMA ran a story, one day after Kostas Simitis was appointed to form a new Greek government as prime minister. The article brought a severe reaction from the Greek press, which was followed by four citizens of the neighboring island of Kalymnos, including the mayor and the owner of a herd of sheep that remained on the islets, hoisting a Greek flag on the east islet on 25 January.

To oppose this, on 28 January some Turkish journalists from Hürriyet landed on the islet with a helicopter, lowered the Greek flag and hoisted a Turkish flag, the whole event being broadcast live on Turkish television. Later, the Greek Navy patrol boat Antoniou lowered the Turkish flag and restored the Greek flag, in violation of the political order which was only to lower the Turkish flag, resulting in an exchange of fierce statements by the Turkish prime minister Tansu Çiller and the new Greek prime minister Kostas Simitis. Turkish and Greek naval forces were alerted and warships of both countries, both NATO members, sailed to the islets.

Nationalistic media seem to have played a role in inciting weak governments in Greece and Turkey to take action over the islets. The Greek government had recently completed two months of limbo induced by former Prime Minister Andreas Papandreou's prolonged illness, which resulted in his resignation. After only one week, the Costas Simitis government, which was still developing its identity, experienced the crisis. In contrast, Turkey's national election in late December was a stalemate, with competing leaders unable to reach an agreement on a new coalition administration. The opposition Islamist Refah party won the most votes and dominated negotiations and other events. Tansu Ciller led an interim administration without a mandate until a new one was formed. The political uncertainty in Athens and Ankara made them exposed to predatory press, enabling the issue to quickly escalate. Greece and Turkey accused each other of using domestic uncertainty for hostile actions.

== Military crisis ==
Imia Crisis
- Part of Aegean dispute
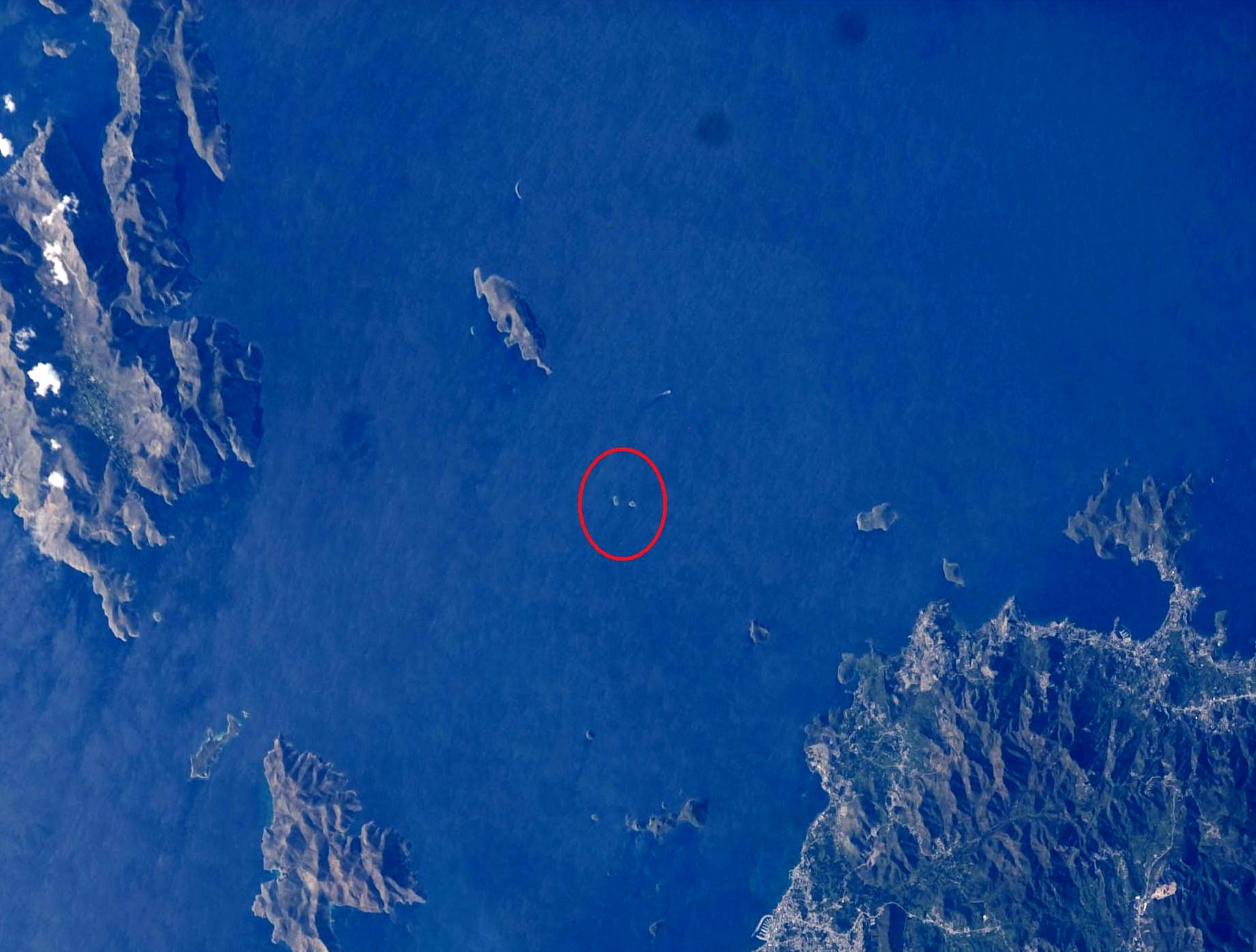
- Location of the islands
Date	28–31 January 1996
Location	Imia
Result	Ceasefire

Belligerents
Greece: Hellenic Navy	Turkey: Turkish Navy

Commanders and leaders
Kostis Stephanopoulos (President of Greece); Kostas Simitis (Prime Minister of Greece); Christos Lymperis (Commander-in-chief of the Hellenic Armed Forces)	Süleyman Demirel (President of Turkey); Tansu Çiller (Prime Minister of Turkey); Güven Erkaya (Commander-in-chief of the Turkish Armed Forces)

Casualties and losses
3 killed (helicopter crash)	None

In the night of 28 January, Greek special forces landed on the east islet undetected. On 30 January, Turkish and Greek officials gave statements, each insisting on their sovereign rights on Imia. Also, Turkish armored units moved to the Green Line on Cyprus, which caused the alert of the Cypriot National Guard. On 31 January, at 1:40 am, Turkish SAT Commandos temporarily occupied one of the two islets on Immia and raised the Turkish flag before withdrawing under a United States-mediated agreement that restored the previous military status quo.

Around 3 hours later, a Hellenic Navy Bell 212, took off from the Greek frigate Navarino for reconnaissance. The Greek SEALs confirmed the presence of Turkish forces and were ordered to return to the ship where during its return the helicopter crashed over the islets (some speculating due to Turkish fire), but this was concealed by both states to prevent further escalation, although three Greek officers on the helicopter were killed: Christodoulos Karathanasis, Panagiotis Vlahakos, and Ektoras Gialopsos.

The immediate military threat was defused primarily by American officials—in particular, US envoy Richard Holbrooke, working by telephone with officials of both sides during the final hours of the crisis. The Greeks and Turks did not speak directly to one another but were responsive to Washington's assistance as an informal intermediary. Agreement was given by both sides to the United States to return to the "status quo ante"—i.e., differing views on sovereignty and no military forces on the islets. Greek and Turkish officials provided assurances to the United States that their military forces on and arrayed around the islets would be removed, with the U.S. agreeing to monitor the withdrawal. While US engagement was instrumental in defusing the crisis, the fundamental territorial issue has remained unresolved since that time.

Despite calls from the UN Secretary General and NATO Secretary General for a peaceful resolution, the agreement succeeded after President Clinton's phone calls to the leaders of both countries, along with intensive diplomacy from Holbrooke. Holbrooke stated that while President Clinton was on the phone with Athens and Ankara, Europeans were sleeping through the night. Adding that Europe's inability to take meaningful action in its own theater raises questions.

== Aftermath ==
The crisis had a significant impact on Greece's domestic and foreign affairs. The Greek government weakened with the Greek opposition and media criticizing it, and the incident was viewed by the Greek population as a "national humiliation". The Greek Chief of Staff was sacked, primarily for making public comments on government talks during the crisis. Many Greeks considered the United States' neutral stance as equal to siding with Turkey. Furthermore, Greece was skeptical of the Europeans' seeming neutrality.

The Turkish government claimed victory, although Refah criticized it for succumbing to US pressure. Ciller's popularity increased, but she still couldn't form a government, and made a coalition with the Motherland Party.

Holbrooke was planning to travel to Greece and Turkey to defuse tensions, but he had to cancel his trip because the Greek government wanted to mitigate its political setbacks and appease critics by disregarding Holbrooke.

Later, a Turkish navy officer appeared to question Greece's control of the island of Gavdos during a NATO planning meeting. Greece responded by demanding that Turkey disavow any claims to Gavdos. Even though the Turkish Foreign Ministry said that Gavdos was a technical rather than a political matter, Turkish authorities began alluding to "grey areas"; that is, islets and rocks that are not specifically mentioned in treaties. They then asserted that there were 130 of these islands and rocks.

Following the crisis, many efforts have been made to resolve Aegean disputes and improve bilateral relations.

== Later tensions ==
In January 2016, Greek Defence Minister, Panos Kammenos, flew over eastern Aegean Sea in a military helicopter and threw a wreath into the sea around the islets where the three Greek Navy officers were killed in 1996.

In December 2016, Turkey's Foreign Minister, Mevlut Cavusoglu, said that the islets were "Turkish soil", while the Greek government responded that "Greece's sovereignty over its islands in the Aegean, including Imia, is indisputable and established by international law." European Commission spokesperson said that the EU is urging Turkey to avoid any kind of “source of friction, threat or action directed against a member-state, which damages good-neighborly relations and the peaceful settlement of disputes.”

Tensions around the islets were renewed in January 2017, in light of deterioration of Greco–Turkish relations following Greek refusal to extradite participants of the failed 2016 Turkish coup d'état attempt to Turkey. A Turkish navy missile boat accompanied with two special-forces speedboats entered the area around the islets on 29 January 2017. According to the statement issued by the Defence Ministry of Greece, they were blocked and warned by Greek coast guard vessels and withdrew from the area after about seven minutes. The Turkish armed forces denied that the ships were blocked but did not otherwise deny the incident; they stated that the mission was a part of an inspection of the Aksaz Naval Base by chief of General Staff Hulusi Akar, who was on board at the time.

In February 2018, Greek authorities said that a Turkish coast guard patrol vessel rammed a Greek coast guard boat near the islets. Nobody was injured, but the Greek vessel suffered damage to the stern where the Turkish boat rammed it with its bow. Greece complained to Turkey about the incident. Turkey's Foreign Ministry denied the Turkish vessel was at fault. It said the Greek statement misled Greece's own public and distorted the truth “as always”. The next day footage was revealed showing the Turkish patrol boat ramming the Greek boat. Also, Turkey has started to build a watchtower, a facility to accommodate soldiers and a pier on the nearby islet of Çavuş Adası. Thermal cameras will be installed on the island to enable the Turkish Coast Guard to monitor naval activities around the islets.

== Legal status ==
The crucial point of reference for the assessment of the legal status of the islets, acknowledged as such by both sides, is the Peace Treaty of Lausanne of 1923. With this peace treaty, Turkey confirmed large cessions of former Ottoman territory to Greece and Italy which had been de facto under their control since 1911 or 1913. The chain of the Dodecanese islands, which includes the islands neighbouring Imia, were ceded to Italy. Later the rights to these islands were ceded by Italy to Greece with the 1947 Treaty of Paris. However, the Treaty of Lausanne does not mention every single small island by name, but treats them summarily.

Accordingly, at the heart of the legal issue of Imia is the question whether these islands, by virtue of their geographic situation, fall under the scope of the renunciation of sovereignty and the cession to Italy as defined by certain articles of the Treaty of Lausanne. There are also issues relating to the interpretation of a later protocol signed between Italy and Turkey in 1932; regarding certain diplomatic exchanges made between the three parties at various times between 1932 and 1996; and regarding the relevance of actual practice (the factual exercise of sovereignty by either party) prior to 1996.

=== Treaty of Lausanne ===
The provisions in the Treaty of Lausanne that are relevant to the Imia and the related "grey-zones" issue, are the following:

- Article 6

"[...] In the absence of provisions to the contrary, in the present Treaty, islands and islets Iying within three miles of the coast are included within the frontier of the coastal State."

- Article 12

"[...] Except where a provision to the contrary is contained in the present Treaty, the islands situated at less than three miles from the Asiatic coast remain under Turkish sovereignty."

- Article 15

"Turkey renounces in favour of Italy all rights and title over the following islands: [here follows an enumeration of the 13 largest islands in the Dodecanese area, by name], and the islets dependent thereon [...]"

- Article 16

"Turkey hereby renounces all rights and title whatsoever over or respecting the territories situated outside the frontiers laid down in the present Treaty and the islands other than those over which her sovereignty is recognised by the said Treaty, the future of these territories and islands being settled or to be settled by the parties concerned. [...]"

The problem is because Imia is situated just outside the three-mile boundary of Article 6 and Article 12, but is also not in an obvious, strict sense geographically "dependent" (Article 15) on the larger Dodecanese islands (being still closer to the Turkish mainland than to the next larger island). Greece considers that the wording of Articles 12 and 16 together precludes any Turkish claim to territories outside the three-mile boundary once and for all, and that the criterion of "dependency" must be understood in a rather wide sense as covering everything in the whole general area of the Dodecanese outside the three-mile limit, in order to give the provisions of the treaty an inherently consistent meaning. Turkey, on the other hand, claims that the criterion of "dependency" must be understood in a narrow sense, and that formations such as Imia may therefore constitute "grey zones" that the treaty has left undecided; or indeed that Turkish sovereignty over them still holds.

=== Treaty of Ankara and protocol of 1932 ===
- Border Protocol of 1932; Demarcation line
- Geographical points Turkish side
Point	Name in text	Modern name
A	Mordala I.	
B	Kara Ada	Kara Ada
C	Guirejik I.	Gürecik Adası
D	Utchian I.	Kargı Adası
E	Arkialla Pt.	
F	Hussein Pt.	Hüseyin Burnu
G	Lodo	Yassıada
H	Atsaki	Topan Adası / Zouka
I	Kato I.	Çavuş Adası
J	Pondikusa	Büyükkiremit Adası
K	Sandama Peninsula	İnce Burnu
L	C. Monodendri	Tekeağaç
- Italian (later Greek) side
Point	Name in text	Modern name
A	C. Phuka	Ag. Fokas
B	Luro Pt	Akr. Psalidi
C	Kum Pt.	Akr. Ammoglossa
D	C. Russa	Akr. Roussa
E	Vasiliki Pt.	Vasiliki
F	Karapsili Pt.	Akr. Atsipas
G	Kardak (Rks)	Imia
H	Kalolimno	Kalolimnos
I	Agia Kiriaki	Ag. Kiriaki
J	Pharmako	Farmakonisi
- Source: Text of the 1932 treaty and border protocol, and modern maps of the area.

After the Treaty of Lausanne, a dispute arose between Turkey and Italy over some other small islands, not directly related to the area of Imia. This dispute was settled through a compromise, which was sealed in a bilateral treaty in 1932 at Ankara. As an appendix to that treaty, the two governments formally assured each other that they now considered the whole remaining Dodecanese border between them to be uncontroversial, and appointed a bilateral technical committee to trace its exact delimitation cartographically.

The committee produced a technical protocol that was signed by envoys of the two foreign ministries in the same year. This protocol mentions Imia explicitly, as being on the Italian (i.e. later Greek) side. The protocol itself, according to the present-day Turkish argument, does not bear the formal characteristics of an international treaty. The Greek side now holds that it nevertheless constitutes compelling evidence that the Turkish government of the time had made a binding commitment to accepting the delimitation as described in the protocol. The Turkish side holds that the protocol is not binding as an international treaty and therefore has no value whatsoever for the resolution of the present dispute.

=== Treaty of Paris ===
Italy ceded the Dodecanese islands to Greece with the 1947 Treaty of Paris. Article 14 enumerates the islands to be transferred to Greek sovereignty, and states that adjacent islets are to be transferred. The Turkish and Greek sides dispute the meaning of the term. Turkey claims that Imia does not fit into the definition stipulated by the Article 14 of the treaty.

=== Later diplomatic relations ===
After the 1996 crisis, the Turkish and Greek governments have made various claims that certain diplomatic exchanges between Turkey and Italy after 1932, and between Turkey and Greece after 1947, provided proof that the respective opponents at that time held legal opinions different from what they claim today, making their present stance inconsistent and untenable. Thus, Turkey has claimed that both the Italian government during the 1930s and the Greek government between 1947 and the 1950s had shown itself to be well aware that the 1932 protocol did not provide legal grounds for an exact delimitation of the boundary.

Conversely, Greece claims that Turkey, already during the 1930s, had explicitly confirmed to Italy that it considered the 1932 protocol valid and binding. However, most of this evidence is contained in diplomatic exchanges that have never been disclosed to the public by either of the two parties.

Greece also cites as evidence for a former Turkish acceptance of Greek sovereignty the diplomatic procedures around the original delimitation of Flight Information Regions (FIR) within the framework of the ICAO, in 1950. The relevant treaty states that, in the Aegean zone, the boundary between the Athens and Istanbul FIRs was to follow the boundaries of the territorial waters. This implies, according to the Greek view, that both parties at that time were taking for granted that a mutually agreed border did indeed exist, which would contradict the claims of persisting "grey zones" made today by Turkey.

The maps of the air zones published after that agreement (e.g. an official map published by Turkey in 1953) do indeed show a line that runs where Greece today claims the territorial boundary should be, with Imia on the Greek side. Turkey holds that the agreement about the FIR boundaries was not concerned with determining sovereignty, and thus has no bearing on the issue.

=== Cartographic evidence ===
During and after the crisis of 1996, both sides put a lot of emphasis on previously published maps, which were cited as evidence purportedly showing that their respective views were shared by third parties, or had even been shared by the opposite side. For instance, a national road map sponsored by the Turkish Ministry of Defense, published just before the crisis, shows Imia (Limnia) as Greek territory. There are other Turkish maps of before 1996 that show Imia as Greek.

However, the cartographic evidence of before 1996 is so mixed that the only safe conclusion one can draw from it is that neither of the two governments ever bothered to enforce a consistent representation of whatever legal opinions they held with respect to these islands, in the work of their cartographic state agencies.

There is also the case of a neighbouring islet, only a few miles from Imia, called Zouka, Dzouka or Topan Adası, which was consistently shown as Turkish in Greek naval maps, but as Greek in Greek topographic maps. When the attention of the Greek government was drawn to this fact in 2004, it was quick to admit that Zouka was in fact Turkish and that the attribution to Greece had been a mere technical mistake, since Zouka in fact lies on the Turkish side of the demarcation line of the 1932 protocol.

Some of the existing cartographic problems can probably be traced back to a 1946–47 British cartographic survey conducted by the crew of HMS Childers. According to the account of its former navigation officer it is possible that the islets in question were wrongfully charted as belonging to Turkey by his predecessor. The reason was that during the Second World War boats of a British Special Boat Service flotilla often evaded German patrols by making fast alongside Turkish fishing boats near the islet and convincing the Germans that they were Turkish fishermen in Turkish territory.

Out of this experience one officer of HMS Childers, who had served the special boat flotilla, probably charted the Turkish name of these islets, Kardak, and attributed them to Turkey. It is well possible that when the whole Dodecanese was ceded to Greece in 1947, these islets may not have been included in official maps because of the wartime experience of a British naval officer.

It appears, in short, that contradictory cartographic evidence in this field has been caused either by wartime mistakes, mere inattention or inadvertent proliferation of previous technical mistakes. It does not necessarily reflect consistent legal opinions or policies of either side. The conflicting cartographic evidence may nevertheless be one of the causes for the different sovereignty claims.

=== Reactions by international organizations and other countries ===
Bill Clinton said about the crisis: "I thought my aides were joking when they said Turkey and Greece would engage in war over rocks on which none but sheep live. I held phone calls with the leaders of both countries, and convinced them to not go to war over the rocks that inhabited mostly 20 sheep".

After 1996, most foreign countries have carefully avoided taking an unequivocal stand on the Imia issue in favour of either side. However, both Greek and Turkish public opinion has been eager to observe the stance of foreign governments on the issue, as evidenced through details such as the cartographic treatment of Imia in maps published by state agencies. Particular close attention has been paid in this context to maps published by US government agencies. Shortly after the 1996 crisis, the US National Imaging and Mapping Agency (NIMA) removed the Greek name Vrakhoi Imia from its maps, adding instead a note saying "Sovereignty undetermined", but in a new edition a few months later, in October 1996, it reverted that move and returned to the Greek name. In addition, the U.S. administration suggested that Turkey's claims be taken to a peaceful resolution according to the international law.

The government of Italy, the original contracting party of the 1932 border protocol, stated on 6 February 1996 that it considered the protocol valid, thus lending support to the Greek position.

The European Union backed the Greek side on the Imia Islets dispute, and warned Turkey to refrain from any military operations against Greek sovereignty, and, along with the European Parliament, called Turkey to solve any disputes it has with Greece through the International Court of Justice. The resolution by the European Parliament entitled "Resolution on the provocative actions and contestation of sovereign rights by Turkey against a Member State of the Union" also stated that Greece's borders were EU borders. In addition, it stated that the islets of Imia belongs to Dodecanese group of islands pursuant to the 1923, 1932 and 1947 treaties and whereas even on Turkish maps from the 1960s, these islets are shown as Greek territory.

After the incident Greece threatened to reopen debate on implementation of an EU customs union accord with Turkey and to block an EU aid package that is part of the accord. Greece mentioned that Turkey broke a commitment under the accord to have amicable ties with EU members. Many EU foreign ministers urged the parties to solve differences amicably. EU members were concerned that Greece's moves against Turkey would violate the customs union accord and interfere with developing ties and access to Turkey's market. The United States were also concerned since they were a proponent of Turkish-European links. The French President Jacques Chirac “indicated that the fewer new problems Greece created for EU-Turkish cooperation, the more likely France would be to show solidarity with Greece.” Other European governments reportedly implied that if Greece sabotaged the customs union, then they would stall talks on Cyprus EU membership.

Greek Prime Minister said that Greece would cooperate with the EU once Turkey agreed to International Court of Justice jurisdiction, but Turkey must initiate an appeal to the International Court of Justice since it is questioning Greek rights. The Greek opposition criticized the government, for its inability to get more support from Europe, while Turkey sent officials to Europe to explain their views and to counter Greece's attempt to impede Turkish-EU relations and recalled its ambassador from Athens.

In October 2019, the US Secretary of State Michael Pompeo, on his first official visit to Greece, when asked about a potential Imia scenario involving an escalation of Turkish aggression in the Aegean, stated that the US and Greece share the same values on sovereignty and vowed that the US would "protect […] these basic ideas of sovereignty".

== See also ==
- Greek–Turkish relations
- Foreign relations of Greece
- Foreign relations of Turkey
