= Kinaros =

Greek island

Native name: Κίναρος
- Location within Greece

Geography
- Coordinates: 36°58′49″N 26°17′23″E
- Archipelago: Dodecanese

Administration
- Greece

Demographics
- Population: 1 (2020)

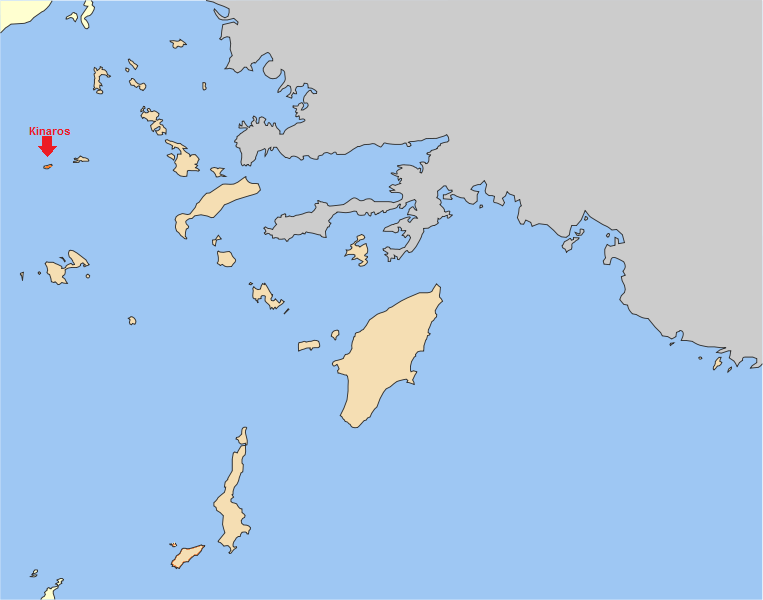
Kinaros on the map

Kinaros (Greek: Κίναρος), is a small Greek island in the Aegean Sea, named after the artichoke (κίναρα; kinara) which it produced. It is located west of Kalymnos and Leros, east of Amorgos, and 5.5 nautical miles west-southwest of Levitha. It is the second westernmost island of the Dodecanese after Astypalea, and has an area of 4.5 km². The island's highest point is 296m. It was noted by several ancient authors including Pliny the Elder, Pomponius Mela, and Athenaeus.

== Population ==
In 2011, the population of the island, according to the census, consisted of 2 inhabitants. This was a Greek couple that returned from Australia and earned a living by raising livestock; as of 2013 only one inhabitant remains.

== Events ==
On 11 February 2016, a Greek Navy Agusta-Bell AB212 PN28 helicopter crashed on the island of Kinaros during a night training mission, killing all three officers aboard.
