= Levitha =

Island in Greece

Native name: Λέβιθα
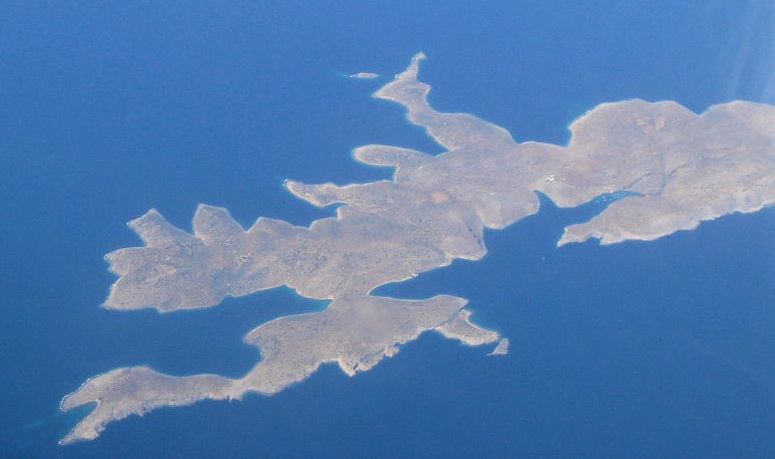
- View of Levitha island

- Location within Greece

Geography
- Coordinates: 37°00′40″N 26°27′35″E
- Archipelago: Dodecanese

Administration
- Greece

Demographics
- Population: 5 (2011)

Levitha (Greek: Λέβιθα), known in classical antiquity as Lebinthus or Lebinthos (Ancient Greek: Λέβινθος) is a small Greek island located in the east of the Aegean Sea, between Kinaros and Kalymnos, part of the Dodecanese islands. It is part of the municipality of Leros. The island is mentioned in two of Ovid's works Ars Amatoria and the Metamorphoses in connection with the saga of Daedalus and Icarus. While escaping from Crete, Daedalus and Icarus flew over Lebinthus. Besides Ovid, the island is noted by the ancient authors Pliny the Elder, Pomponius Mela, Strabo, and Stephanus of Byzantium. In addition, it is mentioned in the Stadiasmus Maris Magni.

As of 2009, the population of the island is five with a family of two children and their grandmother. The total area of the island is 9.2 square kilometres (4 sq mi) and its total coastline is 34 kilometres (21 miles).

== Archaeological findings ==
In June 2019, archaeologists from the Greek culture ministry's Ephorate of Underwater Antiquities department discovered five 2000-year-old shipwrecks at the bottom of the sea near the Levitha island. Along with the shipwrecks, a big granite anchor pole dating back to the 6th BC and amphorae dating back to the 3rd B.C were found. The amphorae were used during the era of the Ptolemaic Kingdom as a container for transporting goods such as wine. Archaeologists assumed that 400 kg weighted anchor pole was used on a “colossal-sized ship”.

== See also ==
- Geography of Greece
- List of Greek place names
- List of islands of Greece
