= Pothia =

Capital of Kalymnos, Greece

Pothia Πόθια
- Settlement
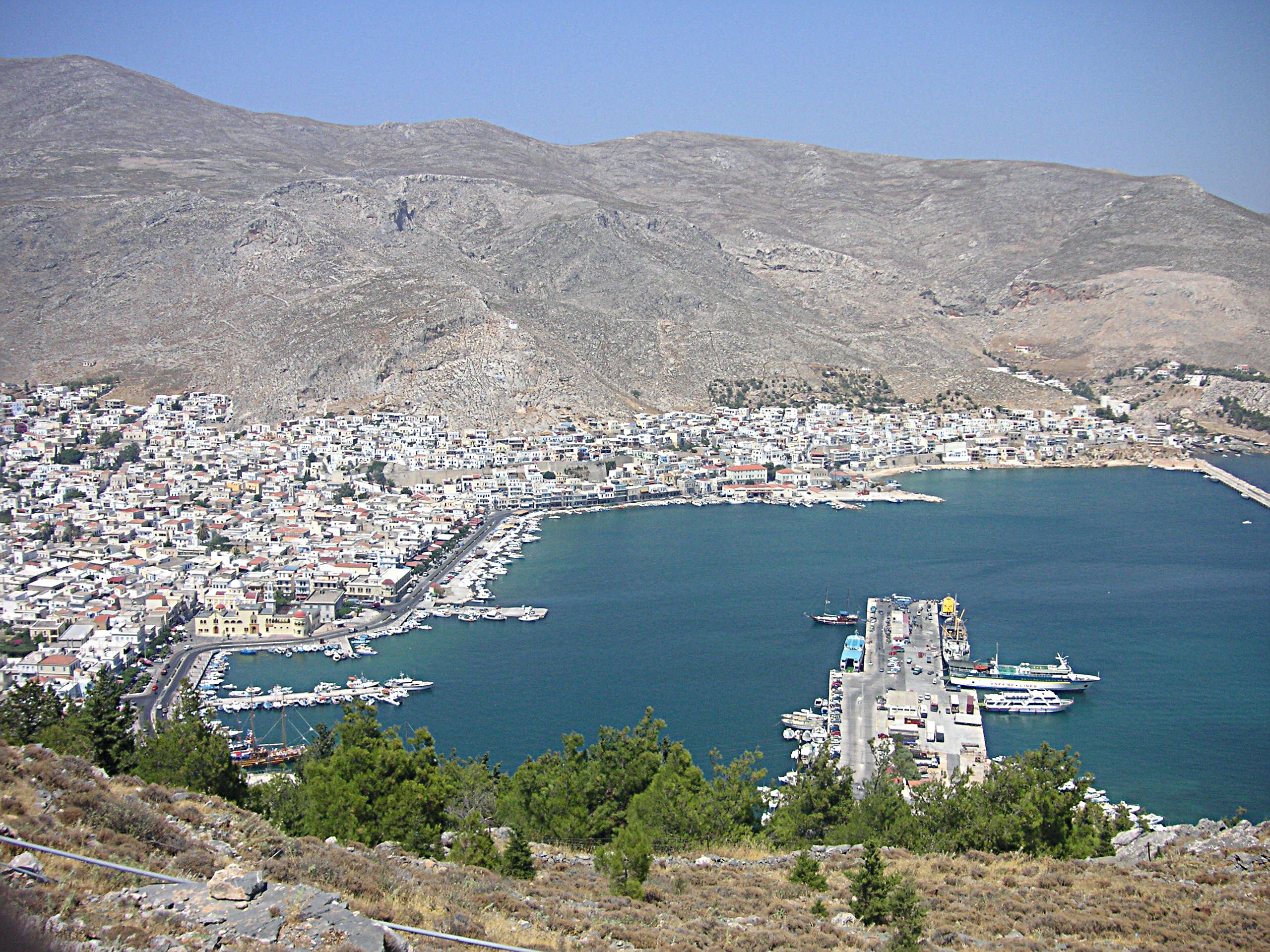
- Panorama of Pothia

- Location within Greece
- Coordinates: 36°57′N 26°58′E
- Country: Greece
- Administrative region: South Aegean
- Regional unit: Kalymnos
- Municipality: Kalymnos
- City established: c. 1850
- Highest elevation: 700 m (2,300 ft)
- Lowest elevation: 0 m (0 ft)

Population (2021)
  - Total: 13,529
- Time zone: UTC+2 (EET)
  - Summer (DST): UTC+3 (EEST)

Pothia or Pothaia or Kalymnos Town (Greek: Πόθια or Ποθαία) is the capital of Kalymnos, Greece, and the major settlement of the island. It is located in the south of Kalymnos on the edge of a bay. It is very close to Chorio or Chora, the old capital of Kalymnos. Pothia is the main port and includes the main public services of the island. The population was 13,529 inhabitants at the 2021 census.

== History ==
Pothia was built in 1850 when the pirates' raids decreased allowing the inhabitants to move near the sea. Its population increased rapidly. During the Italian rule, many Venetian type houses were built.

== Places of interest ==
Near Chora, there is the Pera Castle or Castle of Chrisocheria. Built by Knights Hospitaller, it is one of the most famous sights of the island. Pothia has got two museums. The first is the Archaeological Museum of Kalymnos with collections from archaeological sites of the island and the second is the naval museum related with the sponge fishing and the naval tradition of the island. Other places of interest in the island are the Cathedral of the Transfiguration of Jesus Christ. The temple, built in the 19th century, has got magnificent marble sculpture by the notable Greek sculptor Giannoulis Chalepas.
