= Telendos =

Telendos Τέλενδος
- Settlement
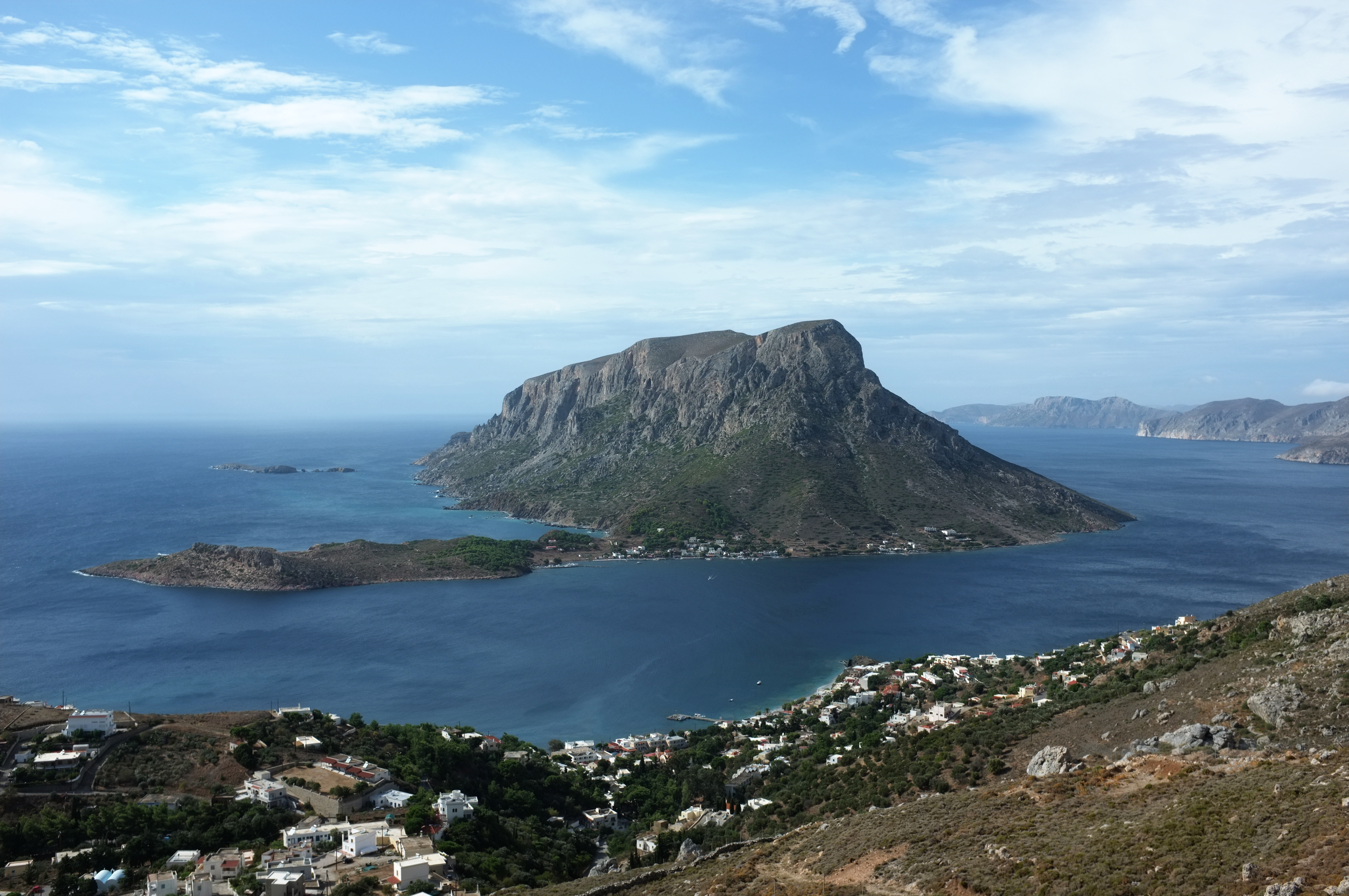
- Telendos and the small village Myrties in the foreground, seen from Kalymnos

- Location within Greece
- Coordinates: 37°00′N 26°55′E
- Country: Greece
- Administrative region: South Aegean
- Regional unit: Kalymnos
- Municipality: Kalymnos

Area
  - Total: 8.5 km^{2} (3.3 sq mi)
- Highest elevation: 450 m (1,480 ft)
- Lowest elevation: 0 m (0 ft)

Population (2021)
  - Total: 66
  - Density: 7.8/km^{2} (20/sq mi)
- Time zone: UTC+2 (EET)
  - Summer (DST): UTC+3 (EEST)
- Postal code: 852 00
- Area code: 224x0

Telendos, (Greek: Τέλενδος) is a Greek island in the southeastern Aegean Sea, belonging to the Dodecanese. It is approximately 1 km (0.6 mi) off the coast of the larger island of Kalymnos, of which it is administratively a part. It was a member of the Delian League.

The island is approximately semi-circular in shape, consisting of a single, steep, flat-top mountain whose sides plunge directly into the sea. The only flat land is at the southern tip of the island, which is where the only settlement is located. There are no cars on the island, and in 2021 the population stood at 66. Telendos was joined to Kalymnos, becoming separated from it in the 6th century AD following a series of earthquakes.
