= Nimos =

Island in Greece

Nimos Νίμος
- Settlement
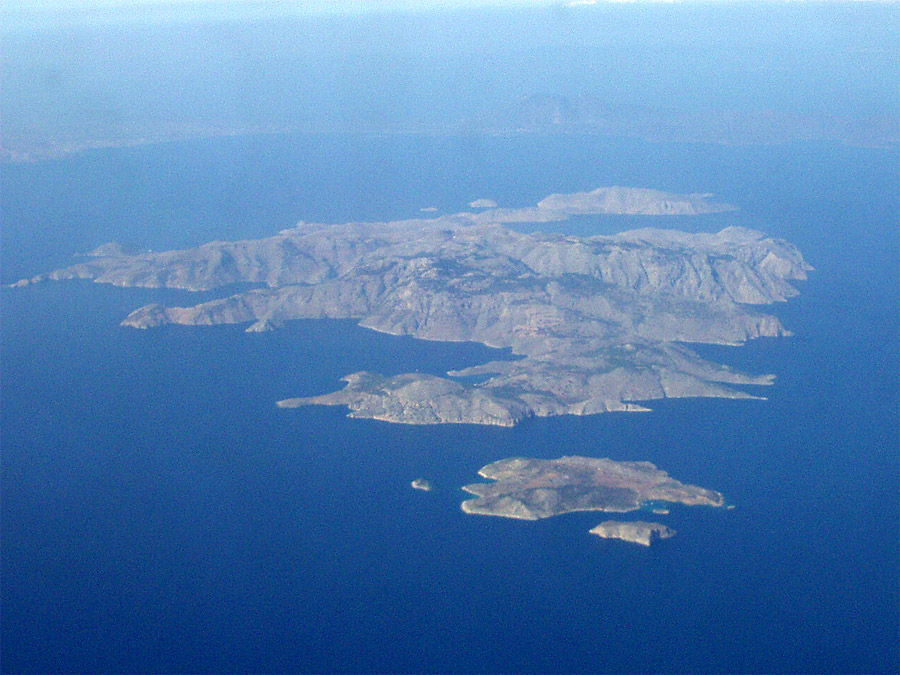
- View of Symi, with Nimos offshore at top right

- Location within Greece
- Coordinates: 36°35′N 27°50′E
- Country: Greece
- Administrative region: South Aegean
- Highest elevation: 617 m (2,024 ft)
- Lowest elevation: 0 m (0 ft)
- Time zone: UTC+2 (EET)
  - Summer (DST): UTC+3 (EEST)

Nimos is an uninhabited Greek island in the municipality of Symi, in the Dodecanese island group of the southern Aegean Sea. Located off the northern coast of Symi, from which it is separated by a small shallow strait called Diapori, it has an area of 4.6 square kilometres (1.8 sq mi). It is the Ymos island of the ancient Greeks.

The island, like Symi itself and the other surrounding islets, has been proclaimed an archaeological site by Greece's Central Archaeological Council.
