= Kalolimnos =

Island in Greece

Native name: Καλόλιμνος
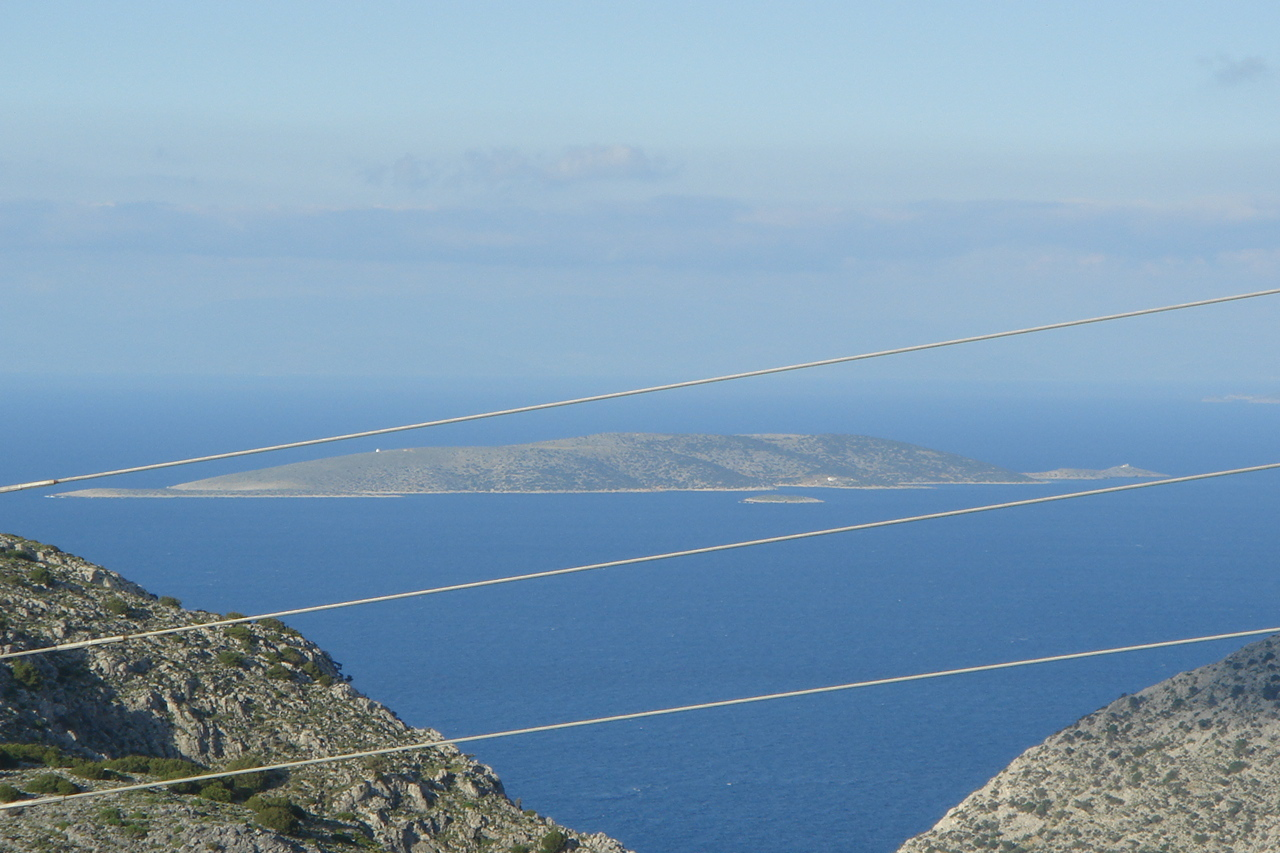
- The island of Kalolimnos viewed from Kalymnos

- Location within Greece

Geography
- Location: Aegean Sea
- Coordinates: 37°03′40″N 27°05′15″E
- Archipelago: Dodecanese
- Highest elevation: 80 m (260 ft)

Administration
- Greece
- Administrative region: South Aegean
- Regional unit: Kalymnos
- Municipality: Kalymnos

Demographics
- Population: 15 (2021)

Kalolimnos (Greek: Καλόλιμνος) is a small Greek island in the Dodecanese chain, lying between Kalymnos and Imia, opposite the coast of Turkey, in the Aegean Sea. It is part of the municipality of Kalymnos.

Kalolimnos reaches an altitude of 80 meters above sea level and has a total area of 1.95 km².

== Population ==
As of the 2021 census, fifteen citizens lived in Kalolimnos, with a permanent garrison stationed there. The island is steep and rocky and has a population of wild goats.

== Infrastructure ==
Kalolimnos features an old lighthouse, which was constructed in 1864 by the French Company of Ottoman Lighthouses, and a military building with a permanent army garrison.

== European migrant crisis ==
During the European migrant crisis, Kalolimnos has been on the frontline of Greek islands that have witnessed the arrival of immigrants from Turkey and is the area where in October 2015 a migrant boat capsized due to the bad weather, resulting in the drowning of four Syrian children. Operations were held by the Greek authorities for the rescue of the remaining survivors who were then transported to Kalymnos.
