= Kalymnos =

Greek island in the Aegean Sea

Kalymnos Κάλυμνος
- Municipality
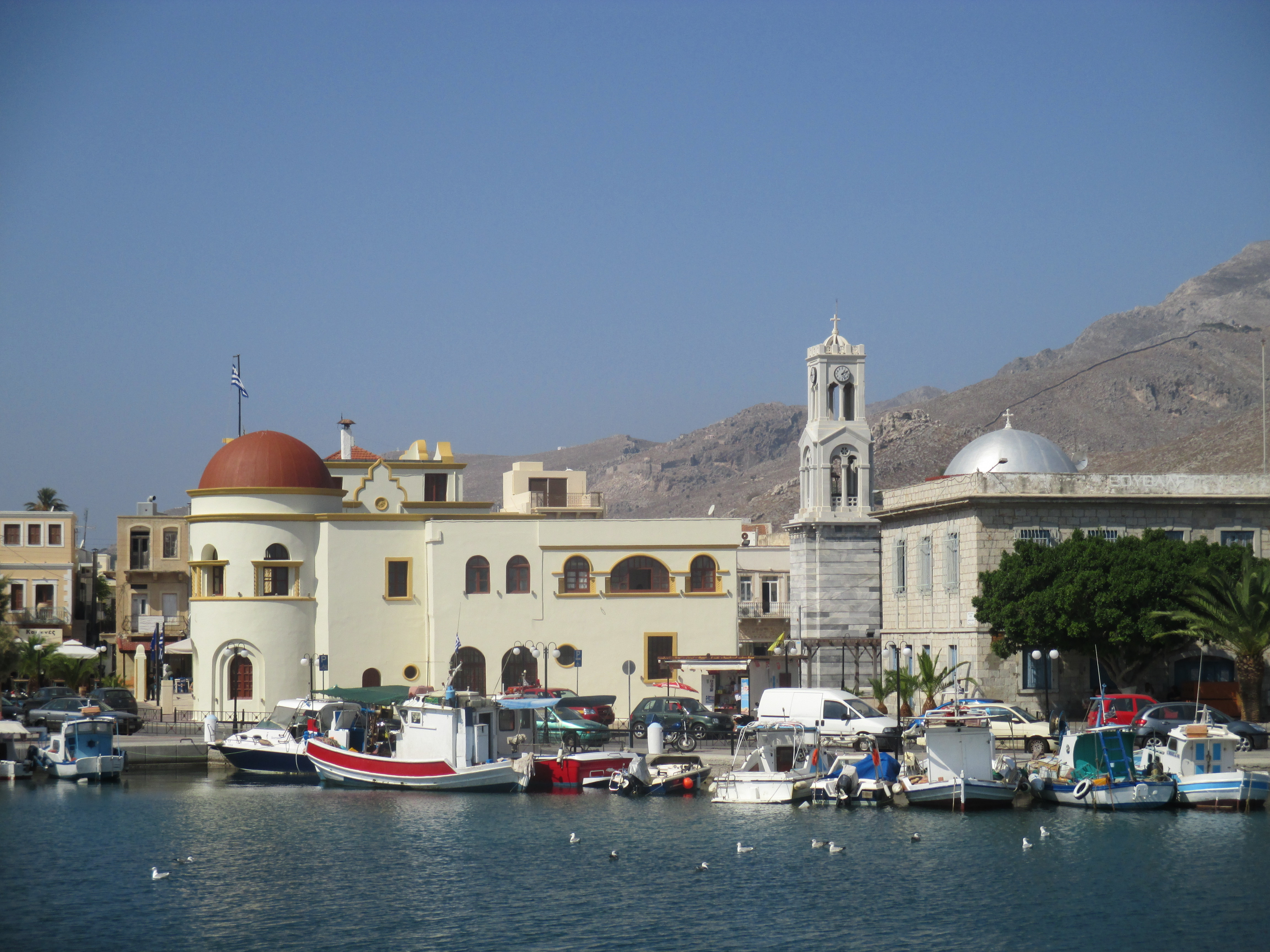
- Pothia, capital of the island

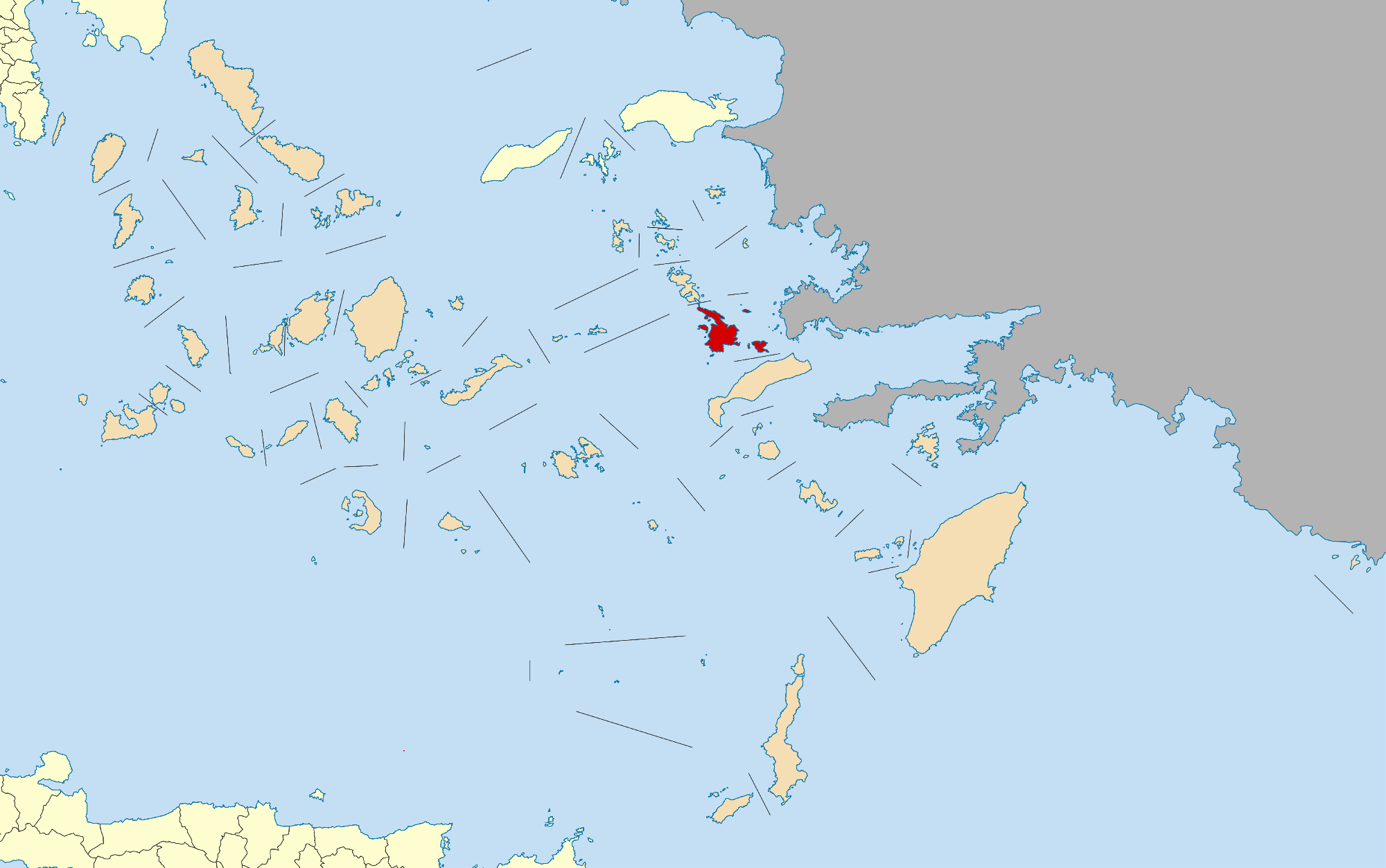

- Location within Greece
- Coordinates: 36°59′24″N 26°59′06″E
- Country: Greece
- Administrative region: South Aegean
- Regional unit: Kalymnos
- Seat: Pothia

Area
  - Municipality: 134.5 km^{2} (51.9 sq mi)
- Highest elevation: 700 m (2,300 ft)
- Lowest elevation: 0 m (0 ft)

Population (2021)
  - Municipality: 17,752
  - Density: 132.0/km^{2} (341.8/sq mi)
- Time zone: UTC+2 (EET)
  - Summer (DST): UTC+3 (EEST)
- Postal code: 852 00
- Area code: 22430
- Vehicle registration: ΚΧ, ΡΟ, ΡΚ
- Website: www.kalymnos-isl.gr

Kalymnos (Greek: Κάλυμνος; Modern Greek pronunciation: [ˈkalimnos]) is a Greek island and municipality in the southeastern Aegean Sea. It belongs to the Dodecanese island chain, between the islands of Kos (south, at a distance of 12 km (7 mi)) and Leros (north, at a distance of less than 2 km (1 mi)), with the latter being linked to it through a series of islets. Kalymnos lies between two and five hours away by sea from the island of Rhodes.

In 2021 the island had a population of 17,752, making it the third most populous island of the Dodecanese, after Kos and Rhodes. It is known in Greece for the affluence of much of its population, and also stands as both the wealthiest member of the Dodecanese and one of the wealthiest Greek islands overall. The Municipality of Kalymnos, which includes the populated offshore islands of Pserimos, Telendos, Kalolimnos, and Pláti, as well as several uninhabited islets, has a combined land area of 134.544 square kilometres (51.948 sq mi) and a total population of 17,752 inhabitants (2021).

== Naming ==
The island is known as Càlino in Italian and Kilimli or Kelemez in Turkish.

== Geography ==
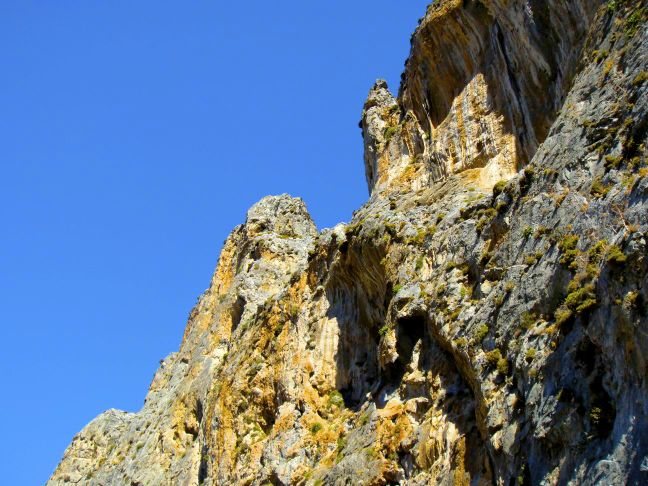
Kalymnos, Sektor Arhi

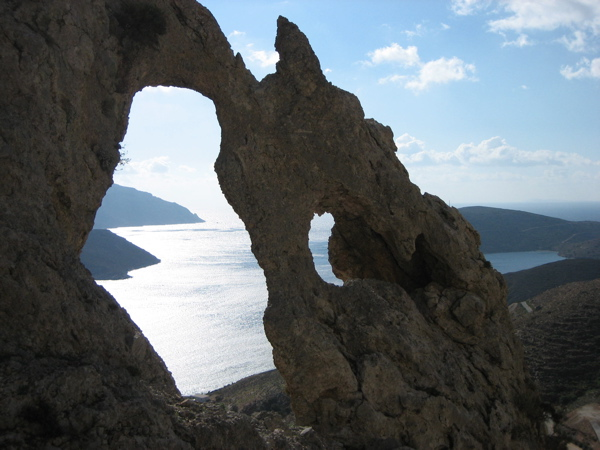
The natural rock arch in Kalymnos.

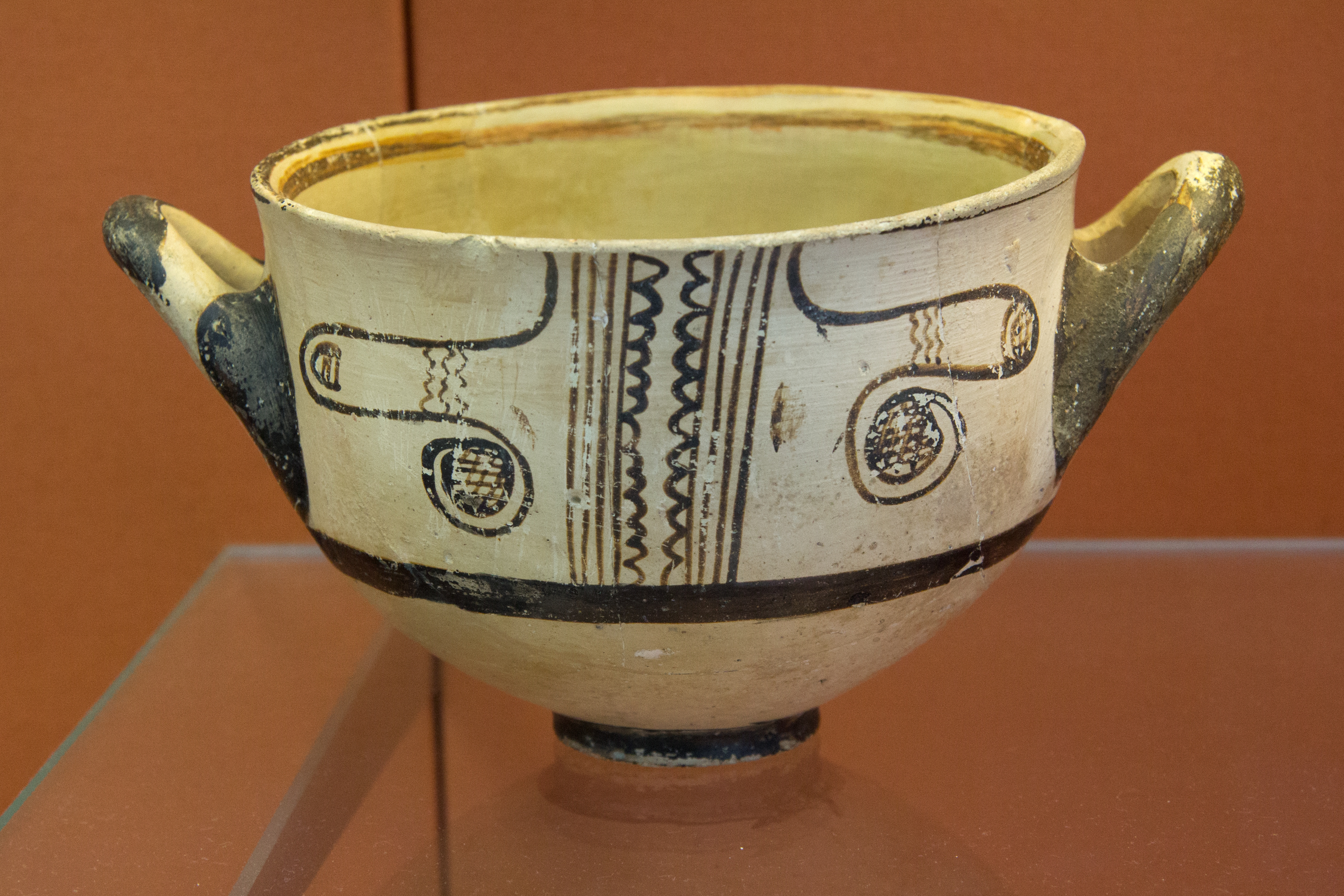
Mycenaean pottery bowl with a pattern derived from the popular cuttlefish motif, 1200-1100 BC (LH IIIc). Found on Kalymnos. British Museum

The island has a length of 21 km (13 mi), is 13 km (8 mi) across at its widest, and covers an area of 109 square kilometres (42 sq mi). Moreover, on the north side there is a peninsula which stretches in a northwest direction.

Kalymnos is mostly mountainous with complicated topography. There are three main chains going from W-NW to E-SE, and a fourth which extends NW the length of the peninsula. The coastline is very irregular, with many sheltered coves. There are some springs, one among them being thermal. The soil is mainly limestone-based, but in the valleys, there is a compact bank of volcanic tuff, the relic of an ancient volcano, located in Vigles, between the villages of Myrties and Kantouni. The island is mainly barren, except for the two fertile valleys of Vathys and Pothia, where olives, oranges and vines are grown. There is also an ostrich farm in Argos, near the airport.

Earthquakes are a frequent occurrence around Kalymnos, a fact that is connected with the volcanoes in surrounding islands. The last earthquake that occurred was the 2017 Aegean Sea earthquake with a magnitude of 6.7M_{w}, which injured two people in Kalymnos.

== Archipelago of Kalymnos ==
Kalymnos is neighboured by the small island of Telendos, which was once part of Kalymnos, but split off after a major earthquake in 554 and is now separated from Kalymnos by a channel of water (about 800 m wide).

Between Kalymnos and Kos lies the islet of Pserimos which is inhabited and, with an area of 11 square kilometres (4 sq mi), is one of the largest of the lesser islands of the Dodecanese. Near Pserimos lies the islet of Platí, and about 5 km (3 mi) to the NE lies the small islet of Kalolimnos.

== History ==
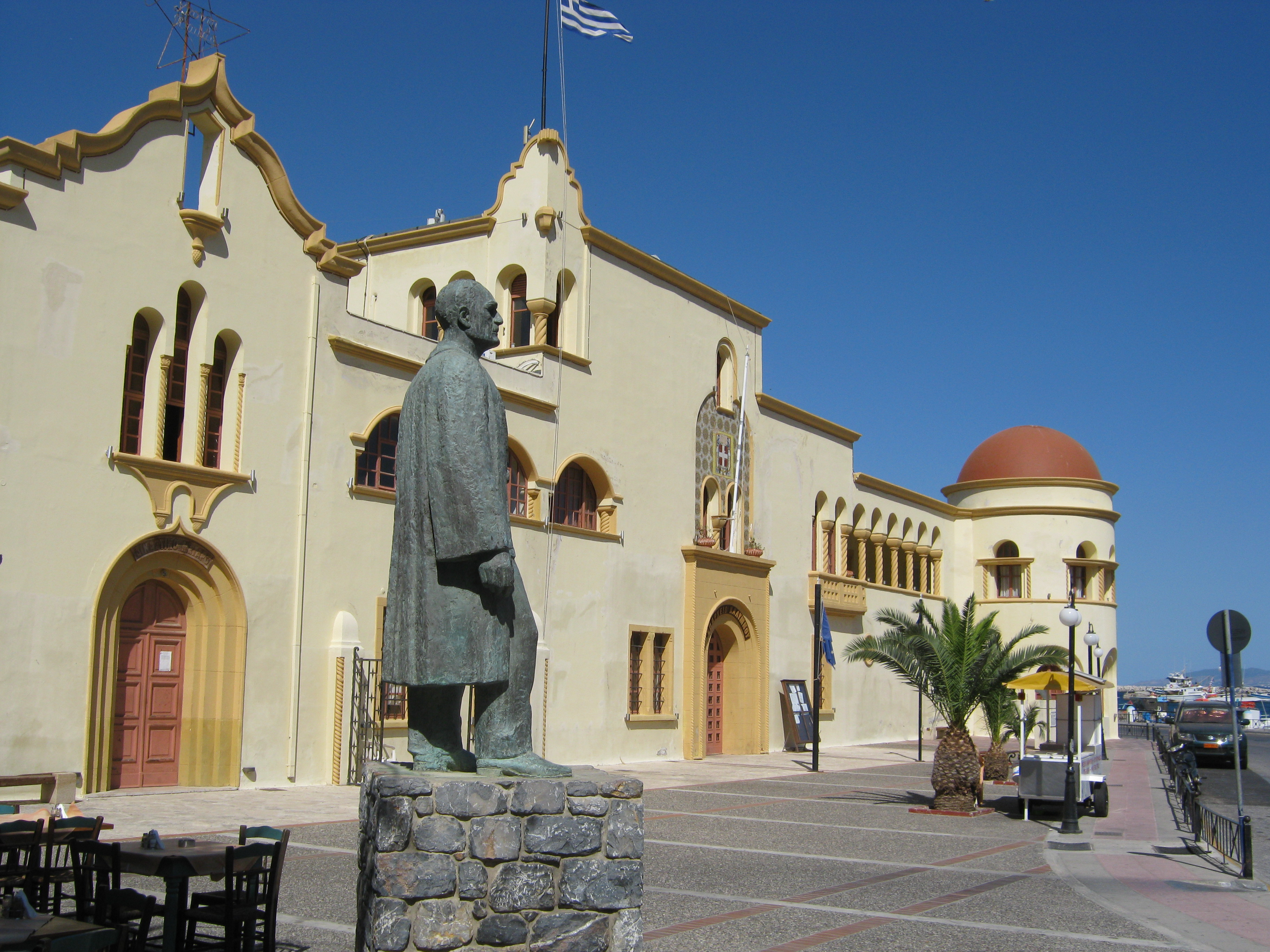
Kalymnos town hall.

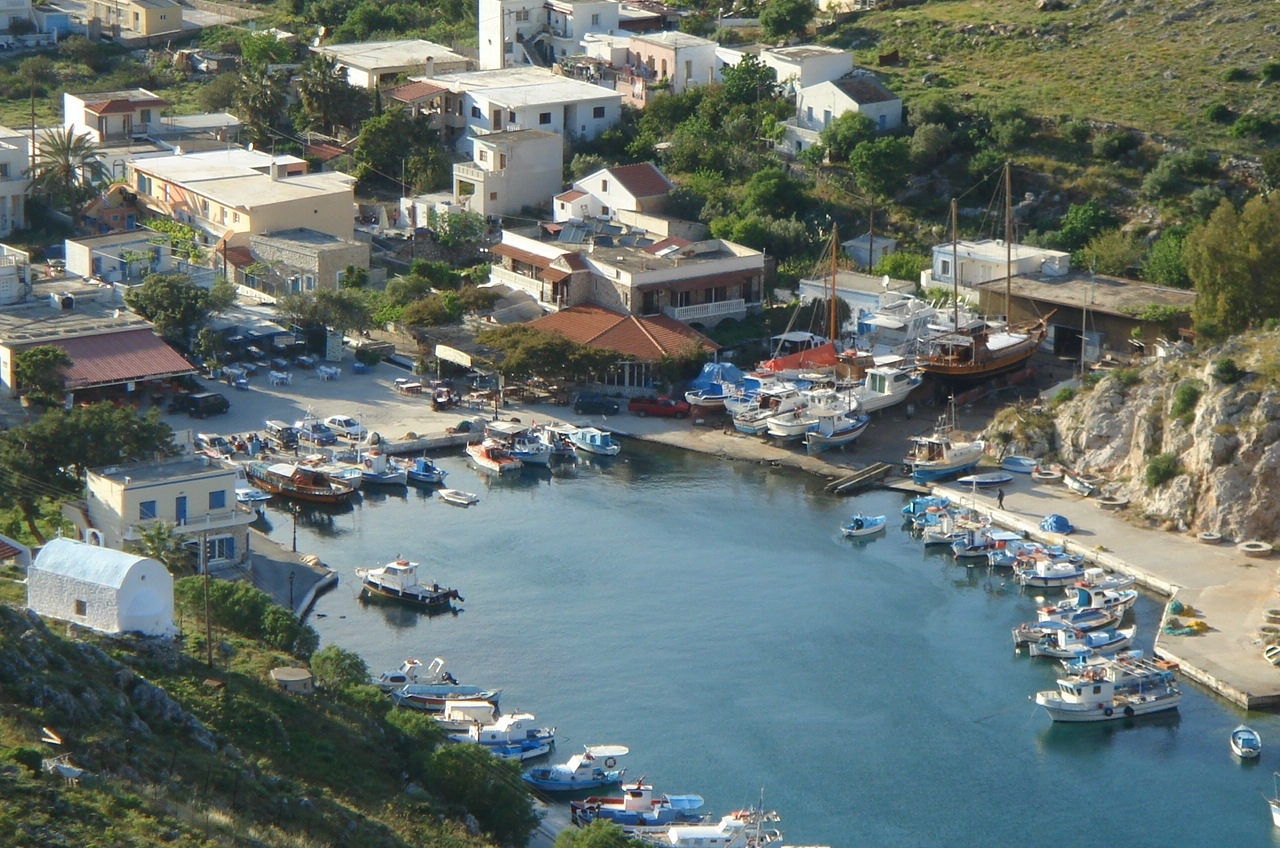
View of Rina, the small port of Vathys

In Antiquity Kalymnos depended on Kos, and followed its history. The island's Hellenistic Temple of Apollo was excavated by the British archaeologist Charles Newton in the nineteenth century; many of the finds he made, including important epigraphic inscriptions, are in the British Museum's collection. In the Middle Ages it was under the influence of the Byzantine Empire, and during the 13th century it was used by the Venetian Republic as a naval base. In 1310 it came under the control of the Knights of Rhodes, and later (mainly in 1457 and 1460) was often attacked by the Ottomans, who eventually conquered it in 1522. Unlike Rhodes and Kos, during the Ottoman period, there was no Turkish immigration to Kalymnos.

According to the Ottoman General Census of 1881/82-1893, the kaza of Kalymnos had a total population of 9,716, consisting of 9,482 Greeks, 64 Muslims and 170 foreign citizens.

On May 12, 1912, during the Italo-Turkish War, Kalymnos was occupied by Italian sailors of the Regia Marina. Italy took control of the island along with other islands of the Dodecanese (except Kastellorizo initially) until 1947, when the Dodecanese were finally united with mainland Greece, as part of the modern Greek state.

== Religion ==
The majority of Kalymnians are Orthodox Christians. The island belongs to that small part of Greece that does not depend on the Church of Greece, but rather on the Ecumenical Patriarchate of Constantinople based in Istanbul, Turkey. Kalymnos belongs to the Metropolis of Leros, Kalymnos and Astypalaia.

There are several Greek Orthodox Christian monasteries and nunneries in Kalymnos, including:

- Holy Monastery of Panaghia Eleousa (Ιερά Μονή Παναγιάς Ελεούσας), Rotso, Kalymnos. The monastery maintains two kathismas, which are the "Thaborion" and Saint Makrina (Αγία Μακρίνα).
- St. Savvas the New Monastery of Kalymnos (Ιερά Μονή Αγίου Σάββα του Νέου εν Καλύμνω). It maintains two kathismas, Saint Nectarios and Saint Stylianos.
- St. Panteleimon Kalymnos Orthodox Monastery (Ιερά Μονή Αγίου Παντελεήμονος Καλύμνου)
- St. Catherine's Monastery (Ιερά Μονή Αγίας Αικατερίνης)
- The Holy Monastery of the Ascension (Ιερά Μονή Αναλήψεως του Κυρίου Καλύμνου)
- The Sacred Monastery of the Annunciation (or Holy Monastery Evangelistria), Argos, Kalymnos
- The Sacred Hermitage of the Holy Trinity of Hali
- The Asketerion of the Cross

== Sponge diving ==
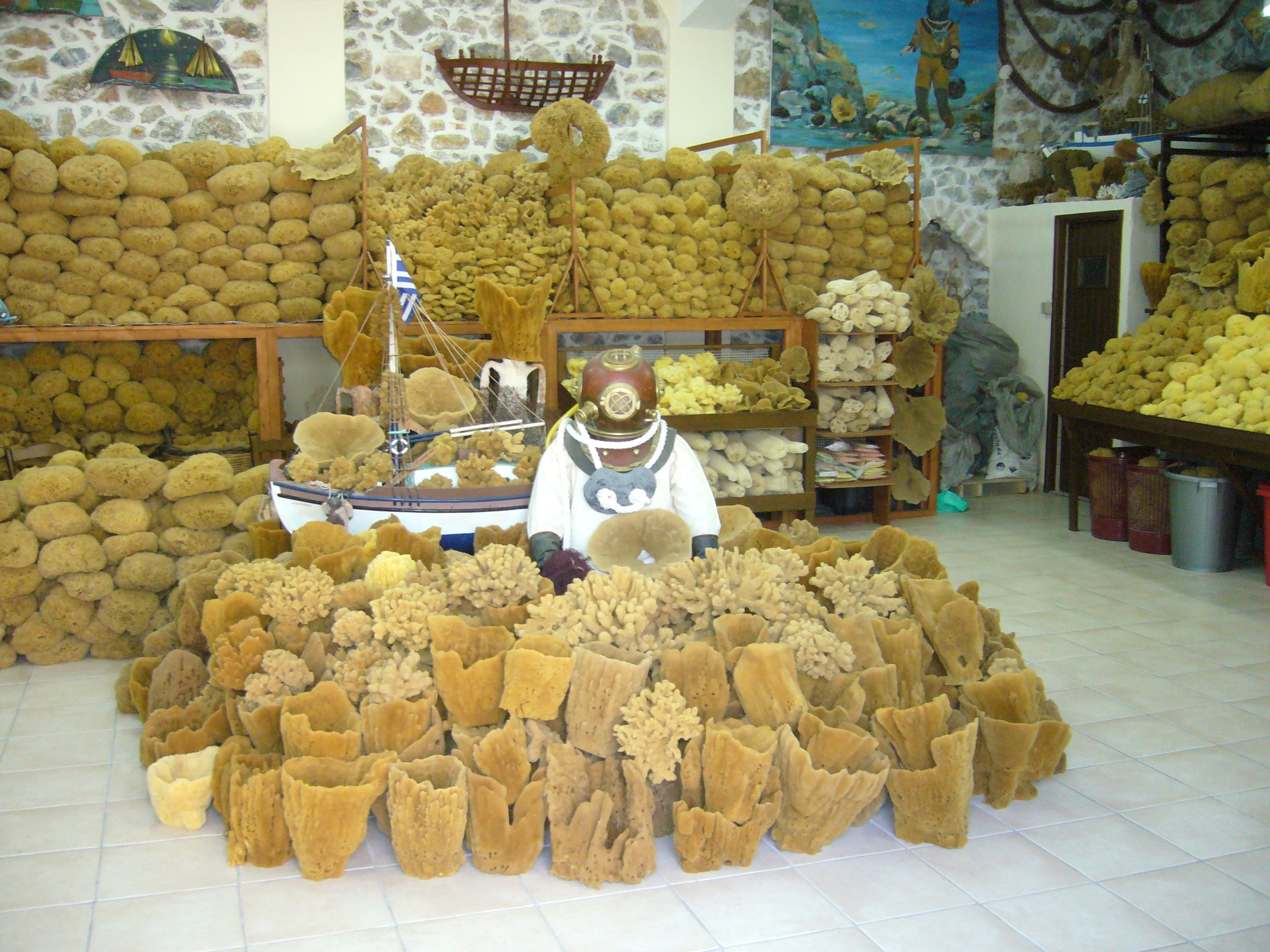
Natural sponges of Kalymnos

Kalymnos is known and billed as the "Sponge-divers' island". Sponge diving has long been a common occupation on Kalymnos and sponges were the main source of income of Kalymnians, bringing wealth to the island and making it famous throughout the Mediterranean. The Kalymnians harvested sponges from the sea-bed as close as Pserimos or as far as North Africa. Early diving was done without equipment (free diving), using a harpoon. Sponges are still fished individually, by hand.

The Greek sponge trade was centered close in the Dodecanese, featuring Kalymnos until the mid-80s, when a disease hit the eastern Mediterranean destroying a great number of sponges and damaging the sponge-fishing industry as a result. Today, Kalymnos faces a lack of sponges due to the outbreak of a disease that has decimated sponge crops.

An annual celebration, Sponge Week, occurs a week after Easter to honour this "Kalymnian gold.”

The local folk dance Mihanikos depicts the crippling effects of decompression sickness that is caused by sponge diving. It is typically only performed by men.

== Climbing ==
Kalymnos is a popular rock climbing location with more than 4,600 climbing routes set in the limestone rock of the island and a climate that allows climbing all year around. The island has seen a boom in climbing related tourism since 1997, when the Italian Andrea di Bari started establishing the first routes.

== Economy ==
Being mostly barren (only 18% of the land can be cultivated), agriculture has always played a minor role in the economy of the island, except for the valley of Vathi. The island is famous for its citrus fruits grown in this area.

Another industrial activity typical of Kalymnos was the production of painted head scarfs, which were the most original component of the female dress.

In recent times, tourism has become important for the island, particularly for rock climbing. In 2006, the island also acquired an airport, the Kalymnos Island National Airport in Argos, a village between Pothia and Brosta (the villages which are opposite of Telendos), to better link the island with the mainland.

Since the beginning of the 20th century, there has been much emigration from Kalymnos (the 1925 population was some 24,000 inhabitants as compared to 16,500 in 2012), especially to the United States and Australia. The cities of Darwin and Melbourne in Australia, and Tarpon Springs (Florida), Gary (Indiana), and Campbell (Ohio) in the United States are home to large Greek communities of Kalymnian descent.

Kalymnian emigrants and their descendants also form a substantial portion of the bridge painting industry in the USA. Some researchers link this to the sponge diving tradition and way of life as both trades involve dangerous work with long periods away from home.

== Election results ==
Election	Turnout	ND	PASOK	SYRIZA	KKE	Other
Jun 2023	35.27	46.93	9.42	14.33	5.14	24.18 (Note: EL 7.48 Niki 5.77 Spartiates 5.50 PE 1.76 Other 3.67)
May 2023	43.51	49.76	7.62	16.75	4.75	21.12 (Note: EL 8.69 Niki 4.40 PE 1.40 Other 6.63)
2019	39.28	37.38	7.87	34.20	3.74	16.81 (Note: EL 7.03 XA 3.27 Μ25 1.83 EK 1.42 PE 1.26 Other 2.00)
Sep 2015	34.88	27.37	6.92	39.52	4.22	21.97 (Note: XA 6.01 ANEL 5.38 LAE 2.41 Potami 2.20 EK 2.20 Koinonia 2.05 Other 1.72)
Jan 2015	42.85	37.50	5.69	26.54	4.52	25.75 (Note: ANEL 9.62 Potami 6.62 XA 3.84 KIDISO 1.77 DIMAR 1.07 Other 2.83)
Jun 2012	41.82	32.77	14.77	19.78	3.82	28.86 (Note: ANEL 13.71 DIMAR 8.20 XA 3.73 Other 3.22)
May 2012	43.86	18.10	14.69	8.30	8.72	50.19 (Note: ANEL 20.28 KOISY 8.25 DIMAR 7.84 XA 3.86 OP 2.09 LAOS 1.77 Other 6.10)
2009	54.44	29.51	57.92	1.86	4.55	6.16 (Note: LAOS 2.33 OP 1.10 Other 2.73)
2007	57.13	42.43	46.72	2.22	4.70	3.93 (Note: LAOS 1.78 DIMAN 1.19 Other 0.96)
2004	59.60	46.24	45.44	1.23	3.67	3.42 (Note: DIKKI 2.02 Other 1.40)
2000	67.84	40.63	49.22	1.52 (Note: as Syn)	3.30	5.33 (Note: DIKKI 4.00 Other 1.33)
1996	67.94	32.74	50.31	2.58	3.32	11.05 (Note: DIKKI 7.89 POLAN 1.90 Other 1.26)
1993	71.71	33.84	59.52	1.13	2.53	2.98 (Note: POLAN 2.31 Other 0.67)
1990	74.85	42.48	51.56	4.33		1.63
Nov 1989	74.46	41.37	53.16	4.73		0.74
Jun 1989	74.58	39.88	50.70	5.97		3.45 (Note: XD 1.87 Other 1.58)
1985	72.47	35.41	57.51	0.82 (Note: as KKE-Es)	5.39	0.87
1981	68.27	25.53	68.91	0.33	4.16	1.07
1977	67.22	42.94	46.24	0.67 (Note: as Symmachia)	2.41	7.74 (Note: EDIK 7.14 Other 0.60)
1974	68.15	43.66	41.36	2.30		12.68 (Note: EK–ND 8.37 DEK 3.59 Other 0.72)

== Notable people ==
- St Savvas the New of Kalymnos (1862-1947), Orthodox Christian Saint and patron Saint of the island of Kalymnos
- Skevos Zervos (1875–1966), professor and surgeon
- Bob Costas (1952- ), American sportscaster of Kalymnian descent
- Mike Bilirakis (1930 - ), American politician of Kalymnian descent
- Gus Bilirakis (1963- ), American politician of Kalymnian descent
- Maria Skyllas-Kazacos, Australian chemical engineer, emeritus professor at University of New South Wales, Inventor of Vanadium Redox Flow Battery

== Gallery ==
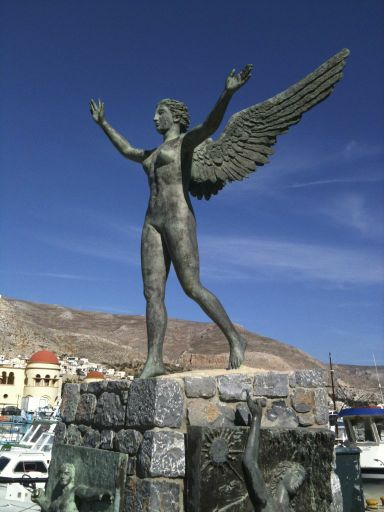
Statue of Nike (Victory)

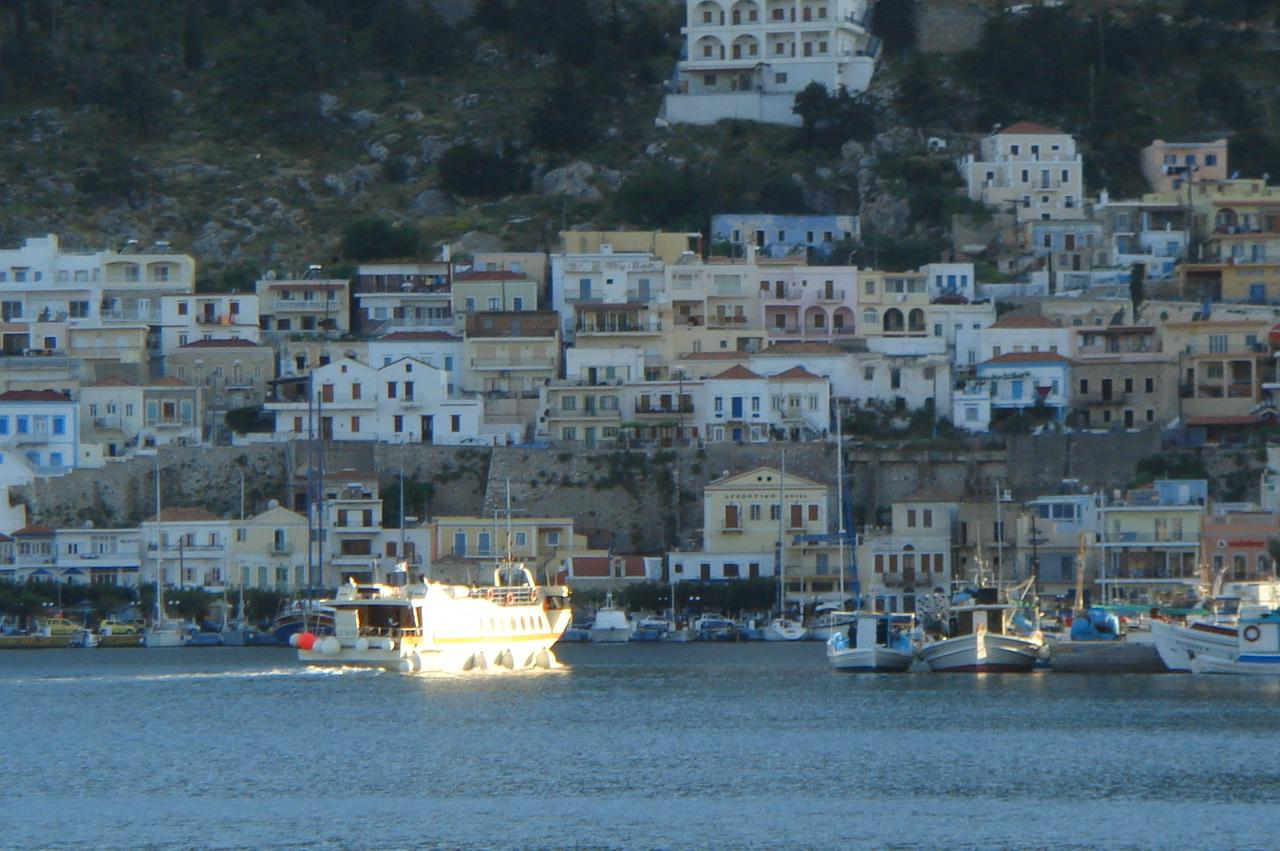
The seafront of Pothia

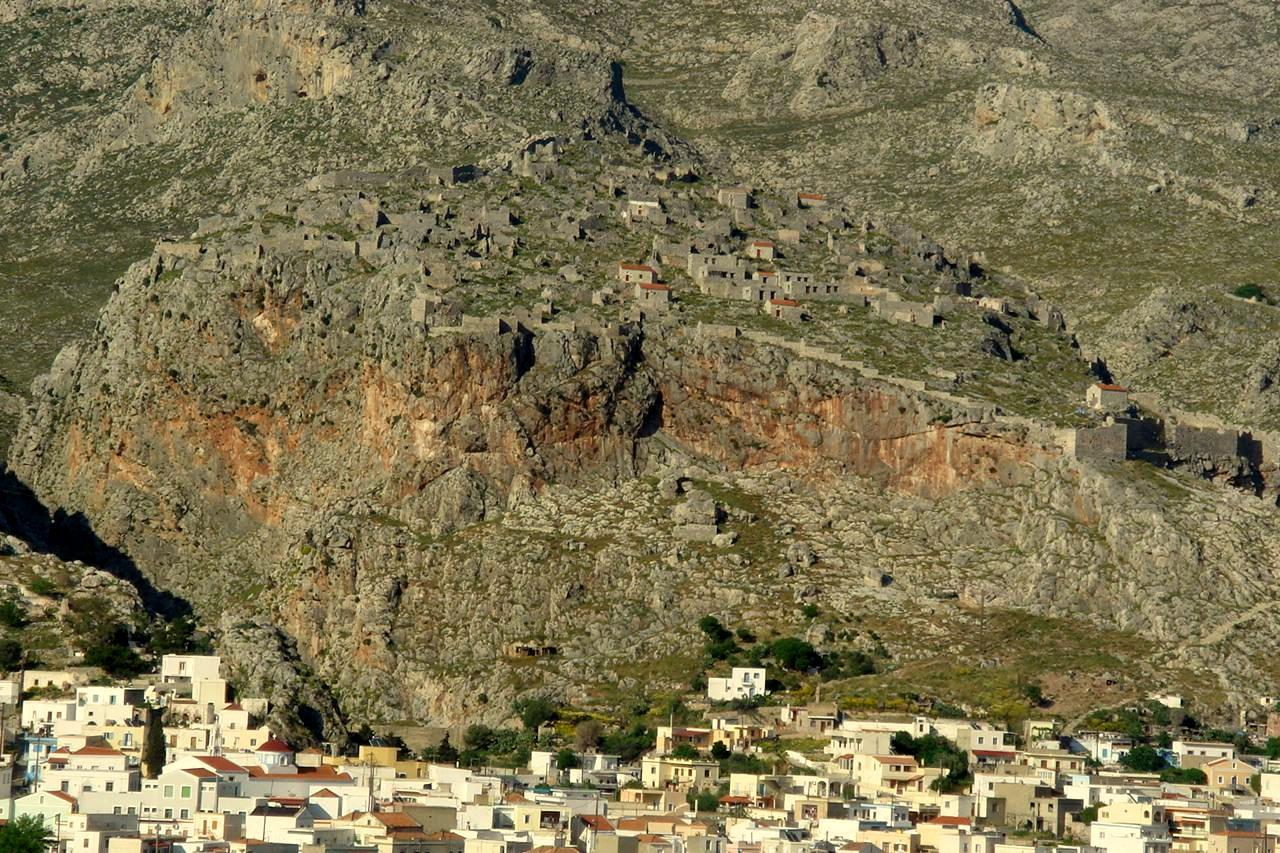
The medieval town-castle of Chorio (or Chora)

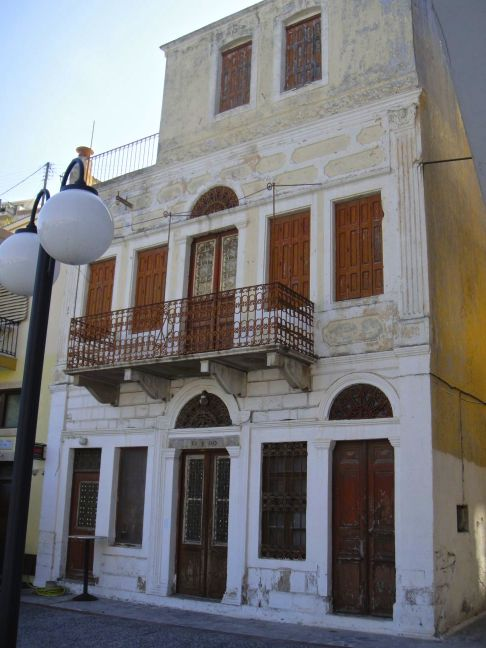
Pothia

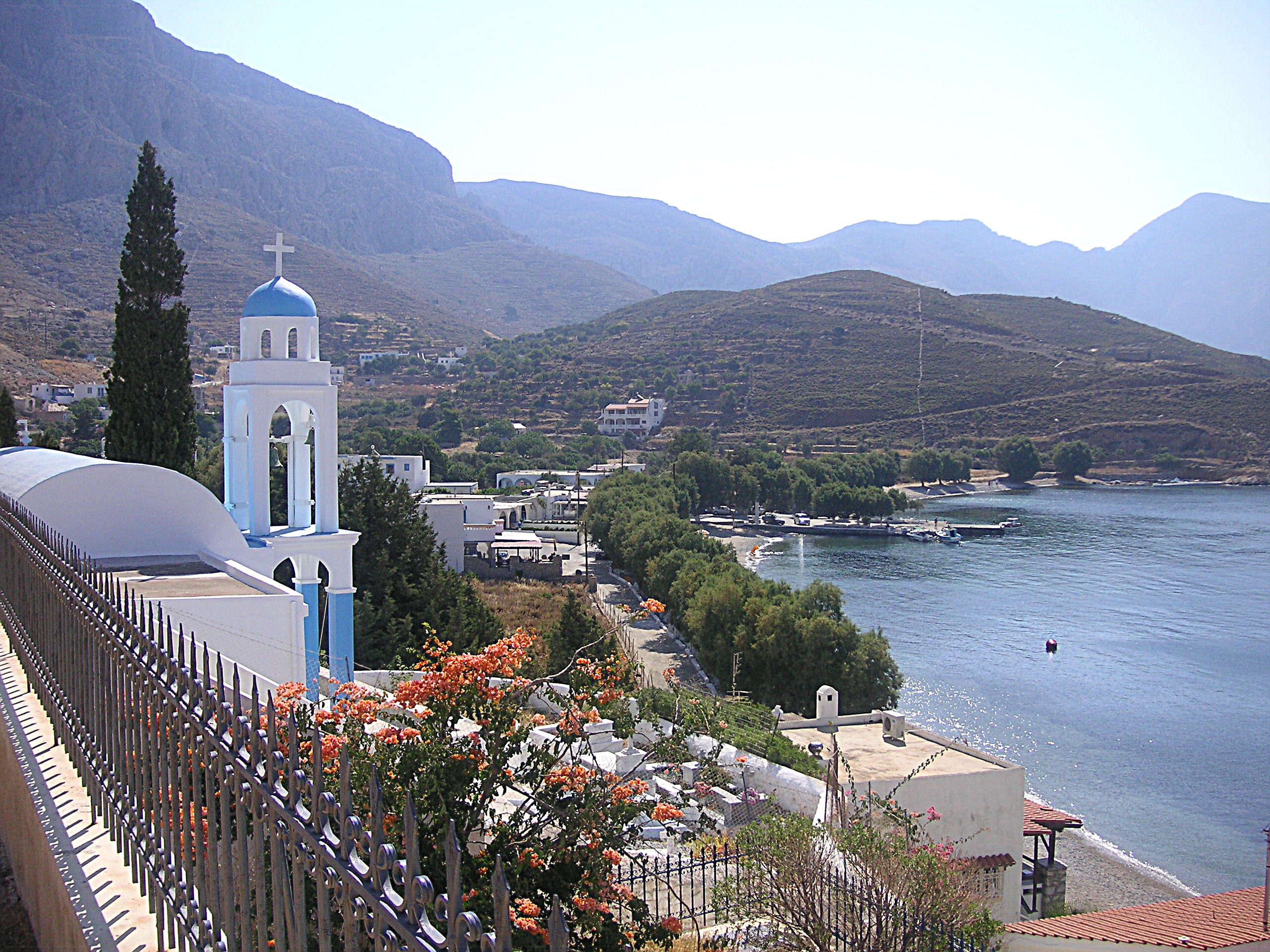
Emborios in the northernmost part of the island

Telendos at sunset

Masouri

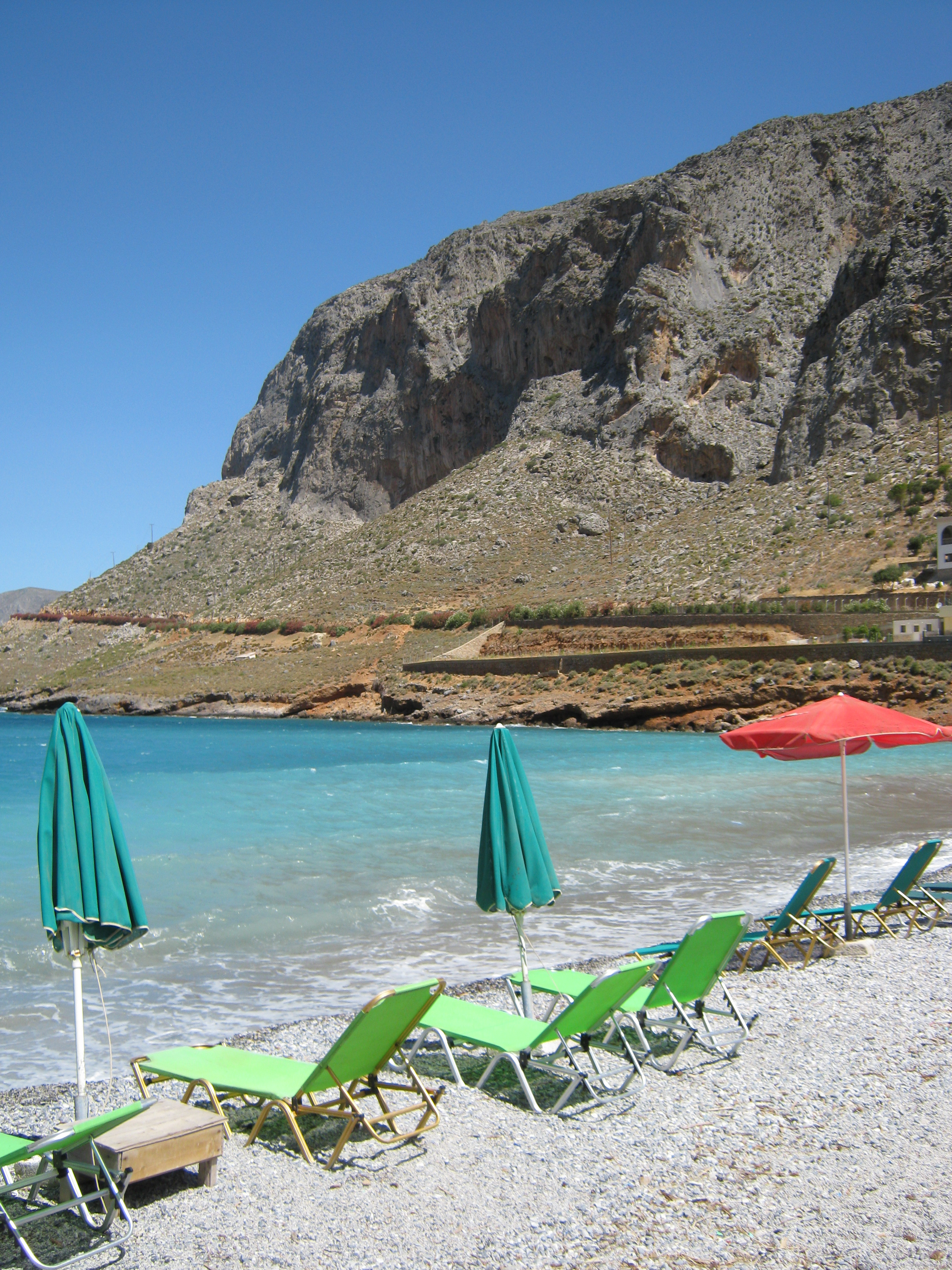
Emborios

Pothia Port

Shopping lanes in Pothia

Pserimos beach

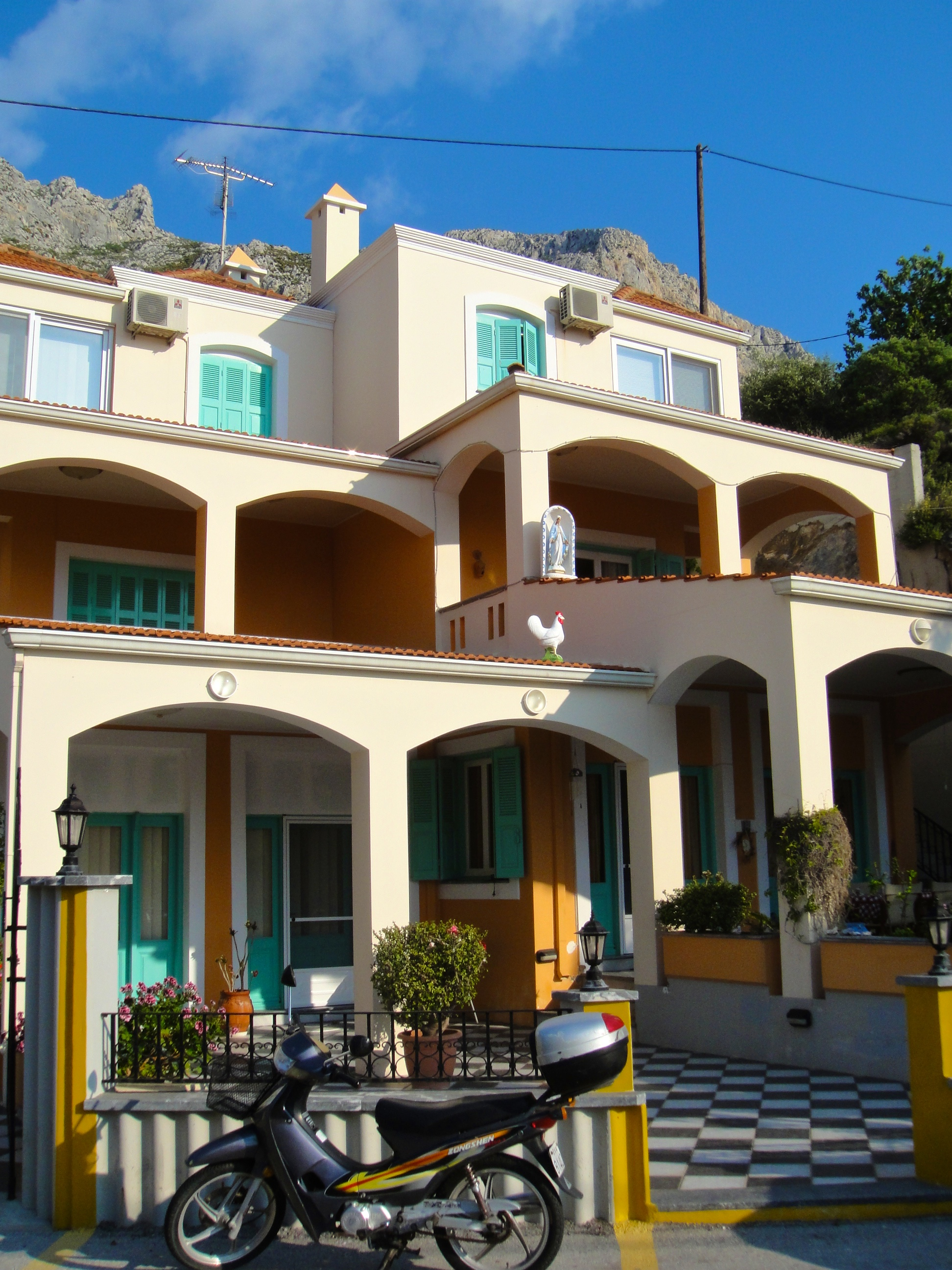
Masouri

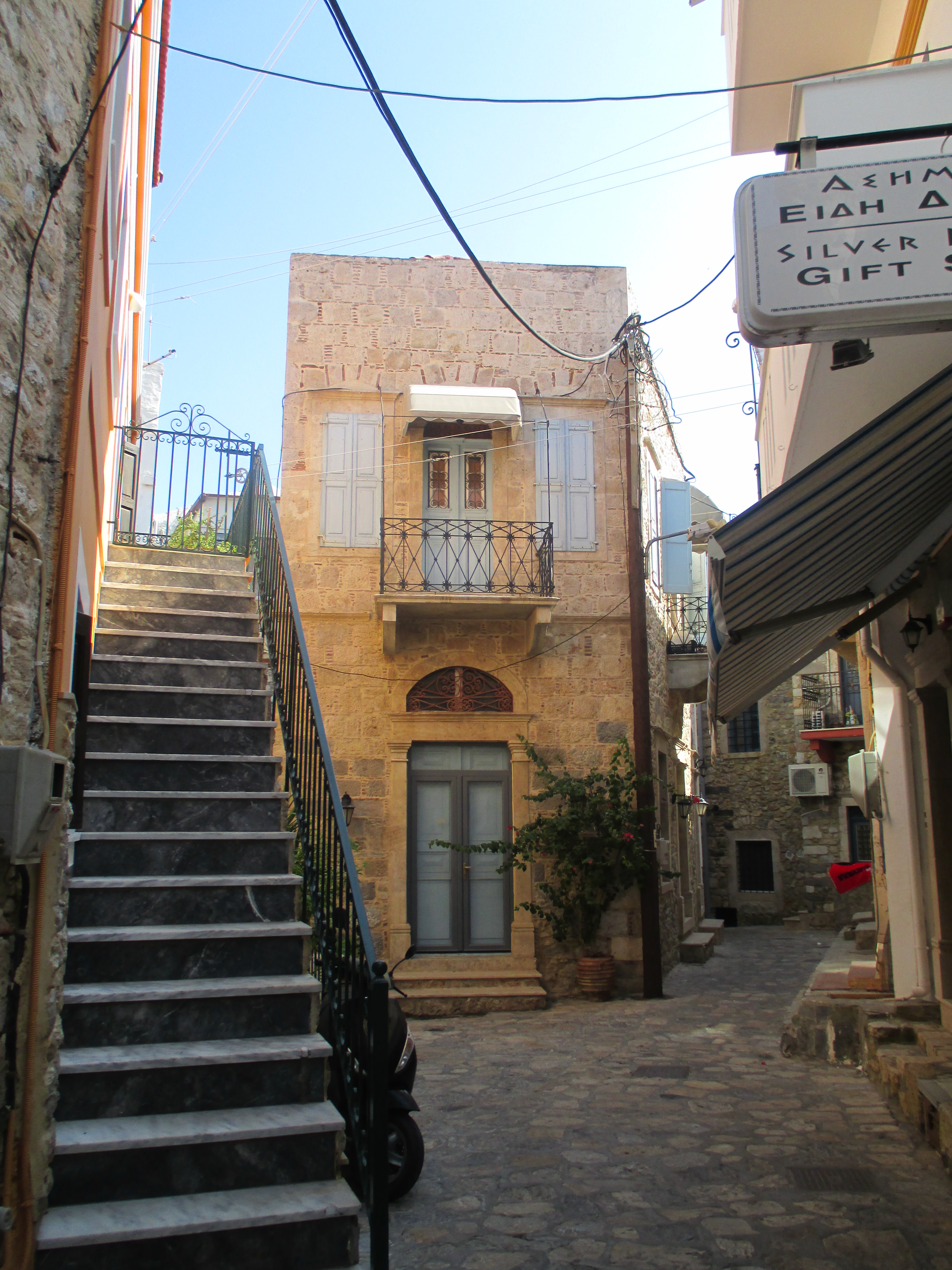
Pothia

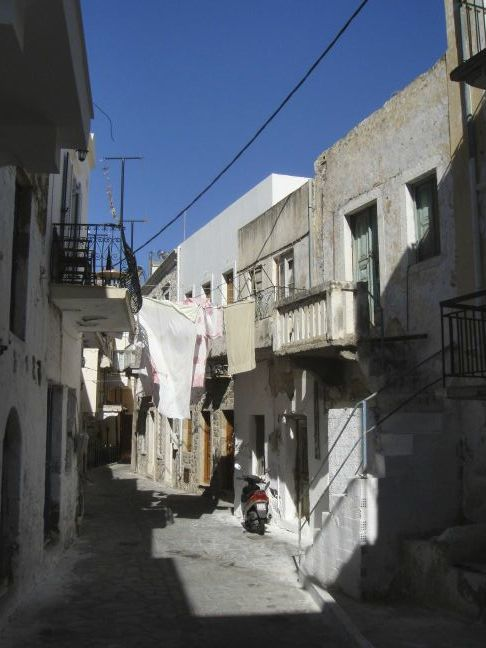
Pothia

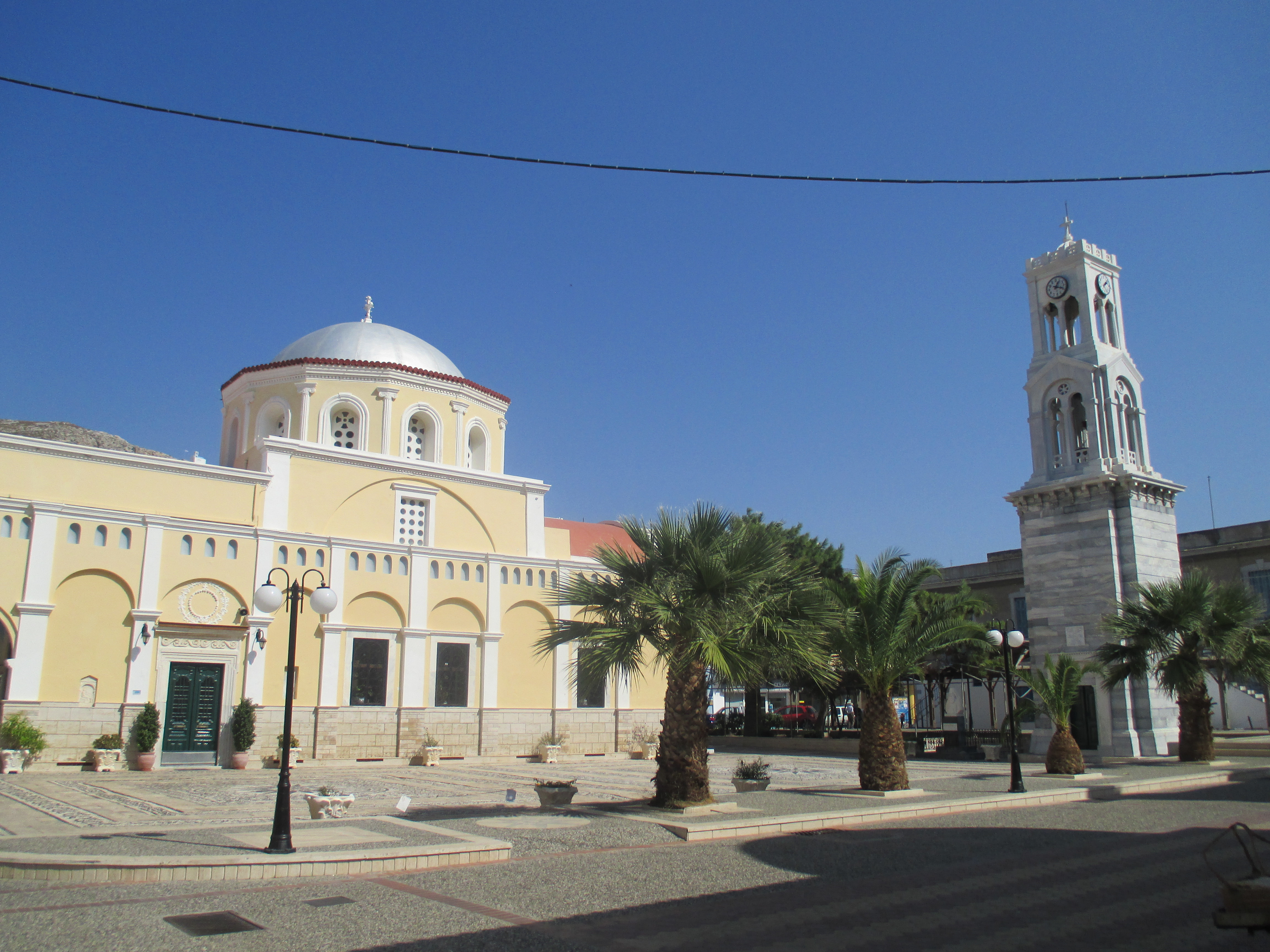
Metamorfosi Sotiros Cathedral

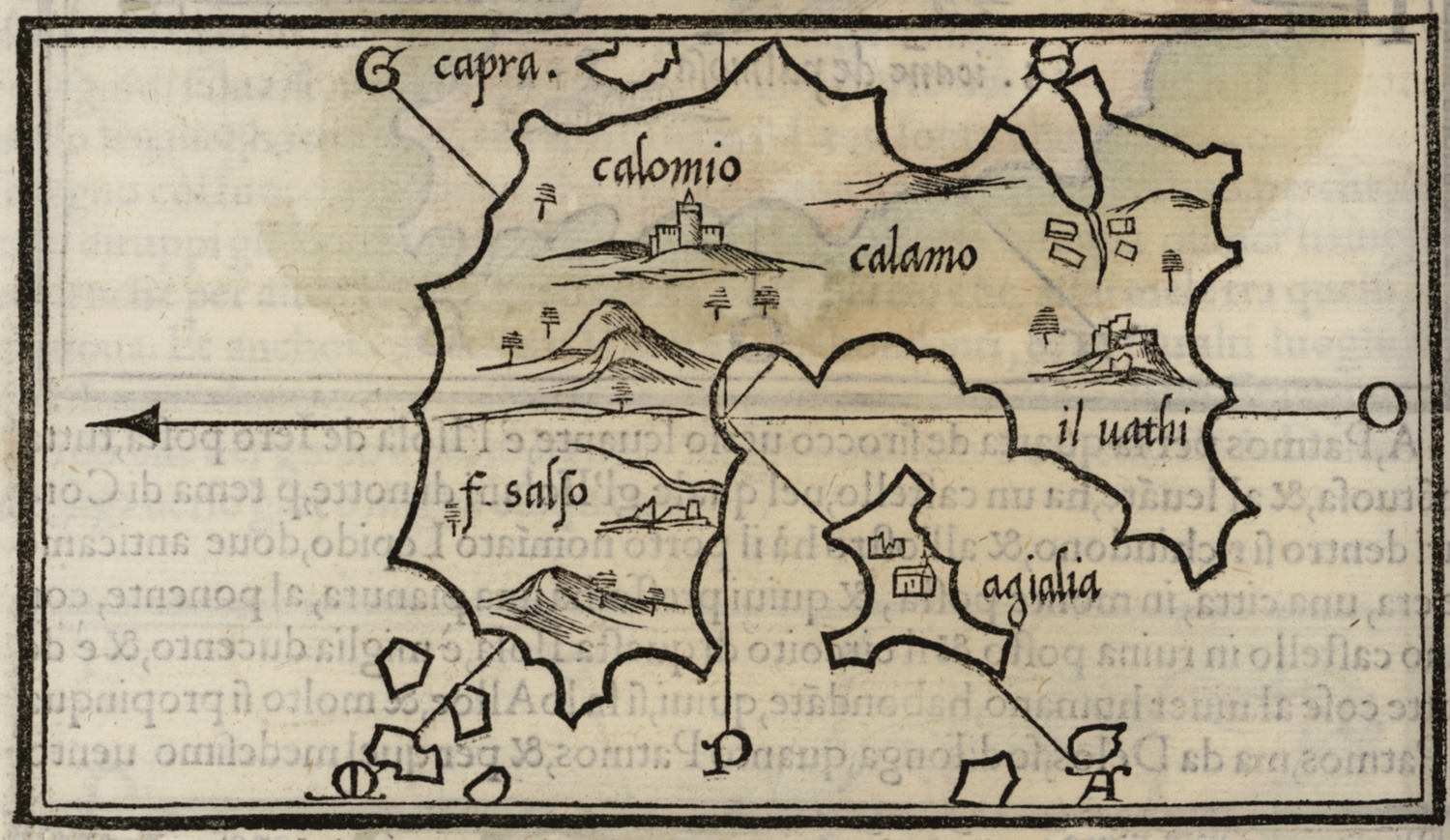
Map of Kalymnos by Bordone Benedetto (1547)

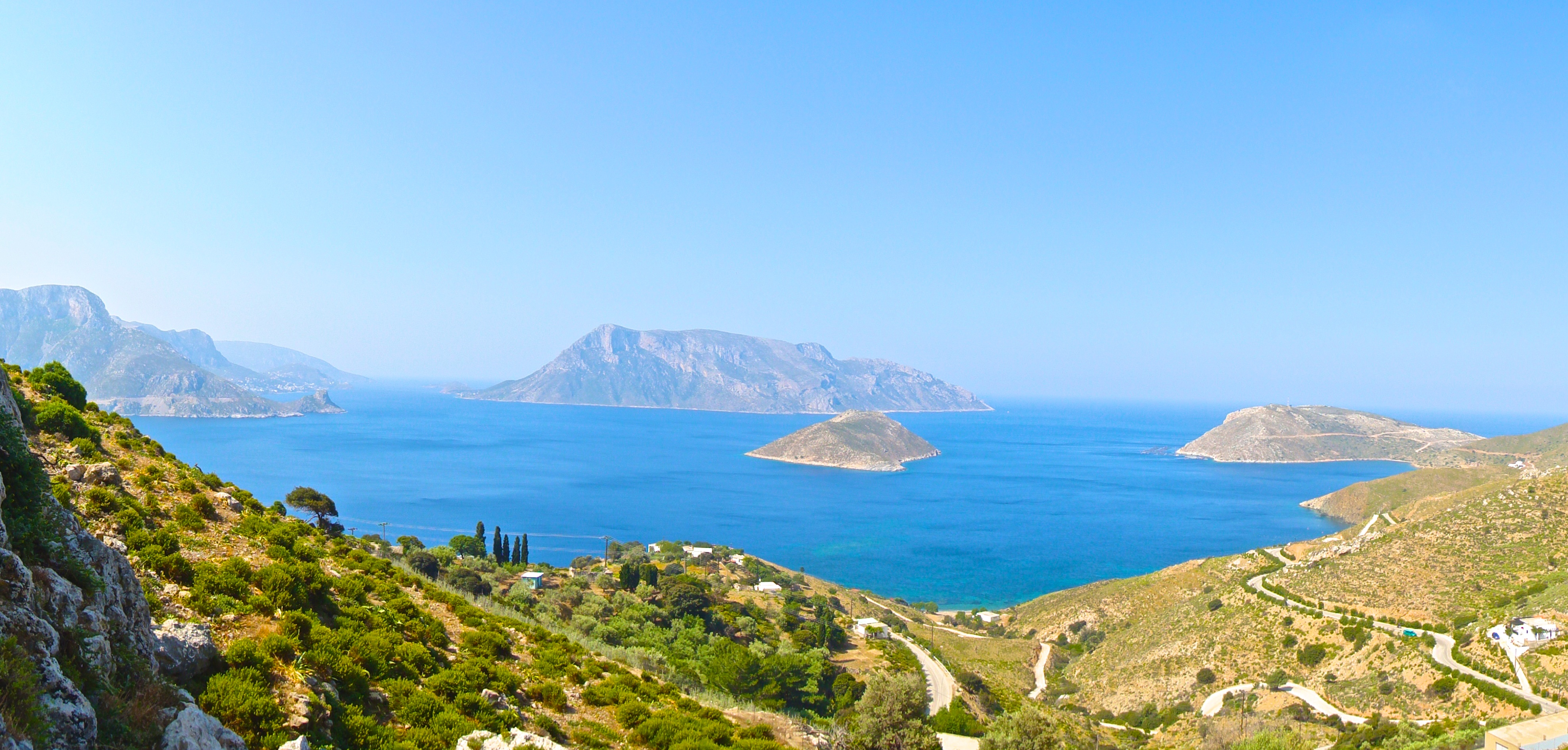
Panoramic view
