= Grotto (disambiguation) =

A grotto is a natural or artificial cave.

Grotto, The Grotto or Grottoes may also refer to:

== Arts and entertainment ==
- Grotto (comics), a Marvel comics character
- Grotto (video game), 2021
- The Grotto (album), by Kristin Hersh, 2003

== Organizations ==
- Grotto (National Speleological Society), an internal organization of the American association
- Grotto (Satanism), a clandestine association or gathering of Satanists
- Mystic Order of Veiled Prophets of the Enchanted Realm, or the Grotto, an American Freemasonry body

== Places ==
- Grotto, Washington, US
- The Grotto (Portland, Oregon), US, or the National Sanctuary of our Sorrowful Mother
- The Grotto (San Antonio), a sculpture in Texas, US
- The Grotto, Victoria, a geological formation in Australia
- The Grotto, a natural cavern in Bruce Peninsula National Park, Ontario, Canada
- The Grotto, a feature of the Playboy Mansion
- Grotten ('Grotto'), a building in the Royal Palace, Oslo, Norway
- Grottoes, Virginia, US

== See also ==
- Grotte (disambiguation)
- Blue Grotto (disambiguation)
- Christmas grotto, an annual Santa Claus-themed staging in retail centers
  - Santa's Grotto, a similar concept themed to Santa's workshop
- Grotta-Pelos culture, a phase of Cycladic civilization
- Grotto of the Redemption, a religious shrine in Iowa, US
- Grotto of Our Lady of Lourdes, Notre Dame, a religious site at the University of Notre Dame, US
