= Iç Ada, Antalya =

Turkish islet near Kaş

Coordinates: 36°07′24″N 29°44′36″E

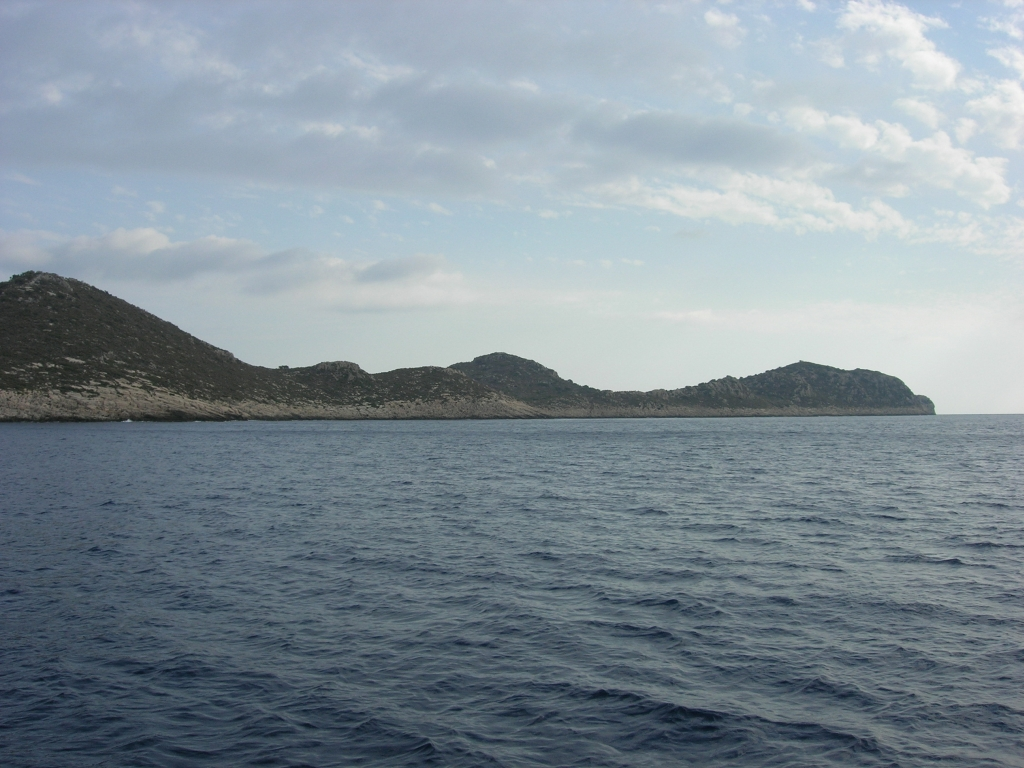
The southern part of the island seen from northwest

İç Ada (lit. 'internal island'; Italian: Alimentaria) is a Turkish islet near Kaş in the homonymous district of Antalya province. It lies in the eastern Mediterranean Sea, about five nautical miles west-southwest of the island of Kekova, and about halfway between Kekova and the Greek islet of Stroggyli. The island has the shape of a right triangle elongated along a northeast-southwest axis, whose legs are 2.5 kilometres (1.6 miles) and 1.2 kilometres (0.7 miles) long. It is separated from the mainland by a 150 metres (492 feet) wide strait. Iç Ada is uninhabited and is covered with macchia.

Contended between Italy and Turkey after the Italian occupation of Kastelorizo, the 1932 Convention between Italy and Turkey which defined the sea border between the two powers assigned it to Turkey.

== Sources ==
- Bertarelli, L.V. (1929). Guida d'Italia, Vol. XVII (in Italian). Milano: Consociazione Turistica Italiana.

== See also ==
- List of islands of Turkey
