= Strongyle =

Strongyle (Greek: Στρογγύλη Stroŋgýlē) may refer to:

- Strongyle (worm), or Strongylidae, a family of nematode worms
- Santorini, once known as Strongýlē, a Greek island in the Aegian Sea
- Stromboli, known to Ancient Greeks as Strongýlē, an Italian island in the Tyrrhenian Sea
- Strongyli Megistis, a Greek islet in the eastern Mediterranean Sea
- Strongyle, one of the previous names of the island of Naxos during the ancient times.
