= Ro, Greece =

Island in Dodecanese, Greece

Ro
Native name: Ρω
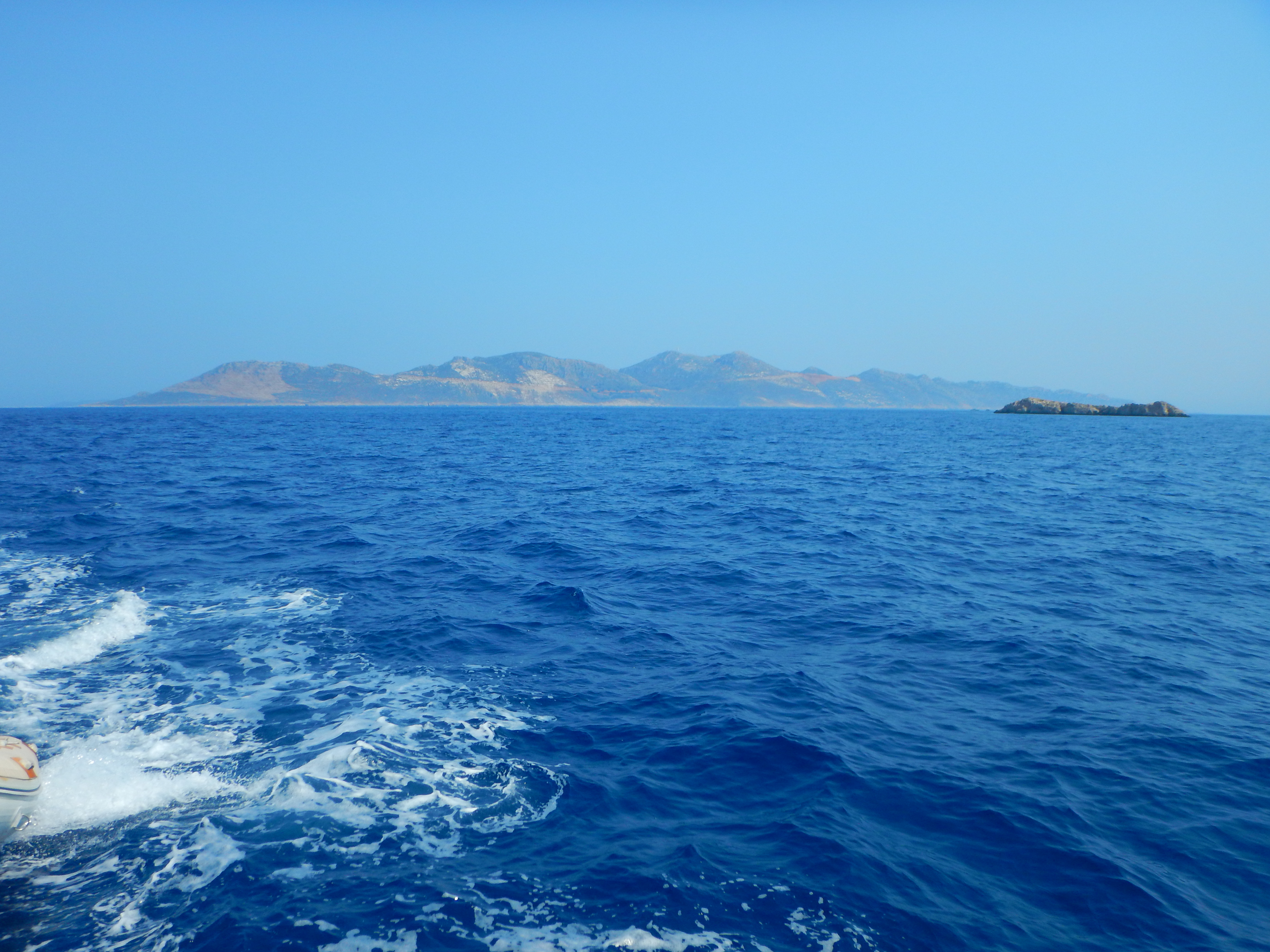
- The island of Rho seen from WNW

Geography
- Coordinates: 36°09′19″N 29°29′50″E
- Archipelago: Dodecanese
- Area: 1.6 km^{2} (0.62 sq mi)
- Highest elevation: 83 m (272 ft)

Administration
- Greece
- Region: South Aegean
- Regional unit: Rhodes

Demographics
- Population: 0 (2011)

Additional information
- Official website: www.megisti.gr

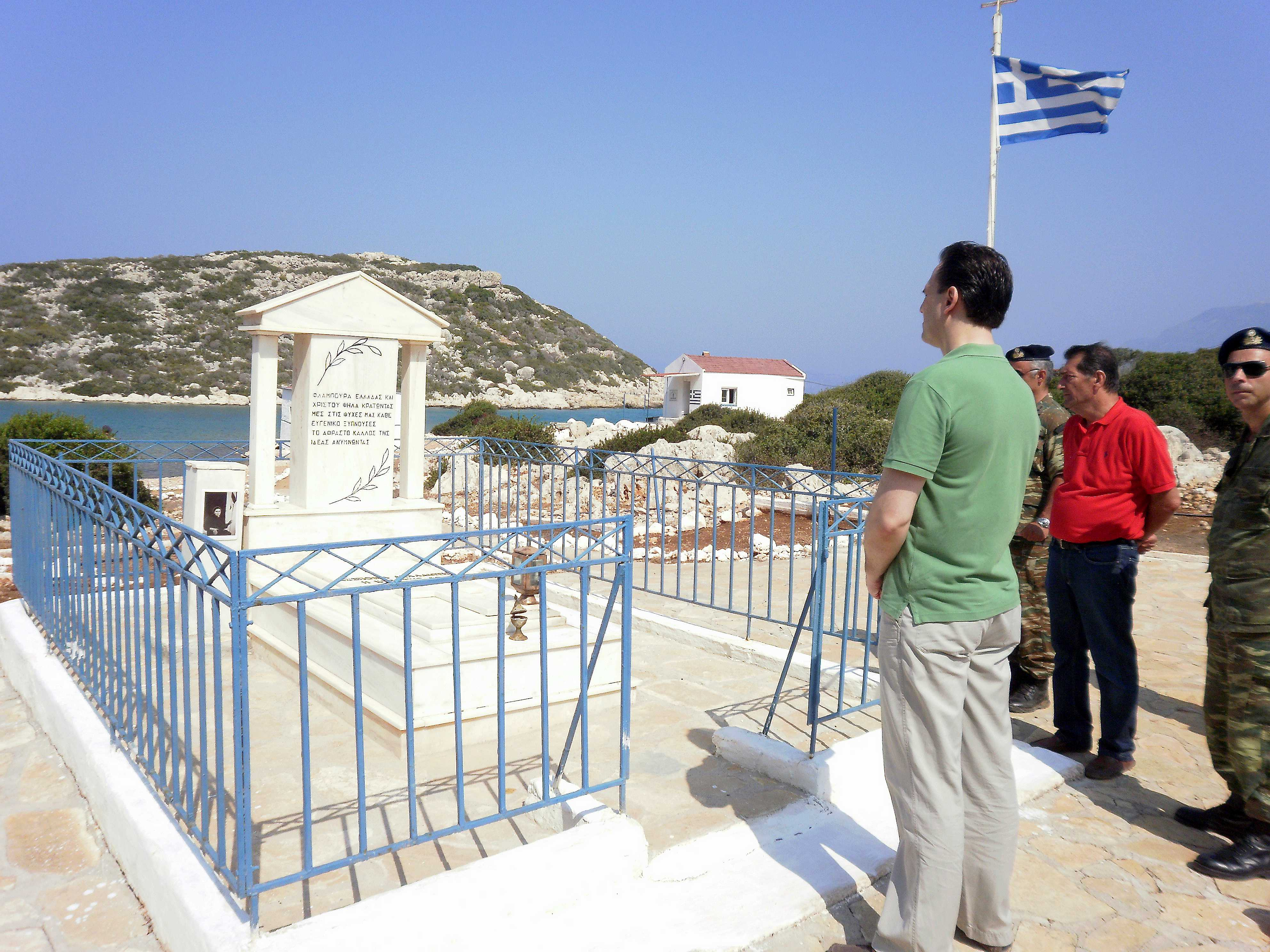
The grave of the Lady of Ro

Ro or Rho (Greek: Ρω) is a small Greek island in the eastern Mediterranean Sea, more precisely in the Levantine Sea, near Kastellorizo, close to Turkey's Anatolian coast. It is part of the municipality of Megisti in the South Aegean region.

== Description ==
Together with other islets in the surrounding region, Ro was the subject of a sovereignty dispute in the 1920s between Turkey and Italy, which at the time was in possession of Kastellorizo and the Dodecanese islands. A 1932 treaty assigned Ro to the Kingdom of Italy. It came under Greek sovereignty in 1947, together with the other former Italian possessions in the Aegean.

The islet is named Kara Ada ("Black Island") in Turkish.

== History ==
Anciently, the island was known as Rhoge (Ancient Greek: Ῥώγη). An inhabitant of the island was called Rogaeus (Ancient Greek: Ῥωγαῖος). Ancient fortifications show that during the Hellenistic period and later, there was a small garrison post on the island. The three towers of Kastellorizo, Ro, and Strongyli comprise the main links in a dense network of watchtowers constructed by the citizens of Rhodes during the Hellenistic period, to control the sea routes and the coast.

Ro has been uninhabited for most of its modern history, except for the one Greek woman, with her husband and her mother, who made it famous, Despina Achladioti. Every day, Achladioti, also known as the Lady of Ro, raised a Greek flag over the island, until her death in 1982.

A Greek border outpost is based on the island, with the primary duty of continuing the tradition of raising the flag daily. According to the 2011 census, the island has no permanent residents.

On 10 April 2018, Greek soldiers fired warning shots at a Turkish helicopter approaching the island. The helicopter was flying at a very low altitude late at night with its navigation lights switched off.

== See also ==
- List of islands of Greece
- Italian Islands of the Aegean
