= Blue Cave =

Blue Cave may refer to:

- Blue Cave (album), an album by Australian rock group Hoodoo Gurus
- Blue Cave (Biševo), a cave in Croatia
- Blue Cave (Kastellorizo), a cave in Greece
- Blue Cave (Penghu), a cave in Taiwan

== See also ==
- Blue Grotto (disambiguation)
