= Grotta =

Grotta may refer to:

- Grotto (Italian: Grotta), a small natural or artificial cave
- Grótta, a tied island in Seltjarnarnes, Iceland
- Grótta Sports Club in Iceland
- Grotta (Naxos), an archaeological site in Naxos after which the Grotta-Pelos culture is named

== See also ==
- Grottasöngr, an Old Norse poem
- Grotte (disambiguation)
