= Kastellorizo =

Island in Dodecanese, Greece

Kastellorizo Καστελλόριζο Μεγíστη
- Municipality
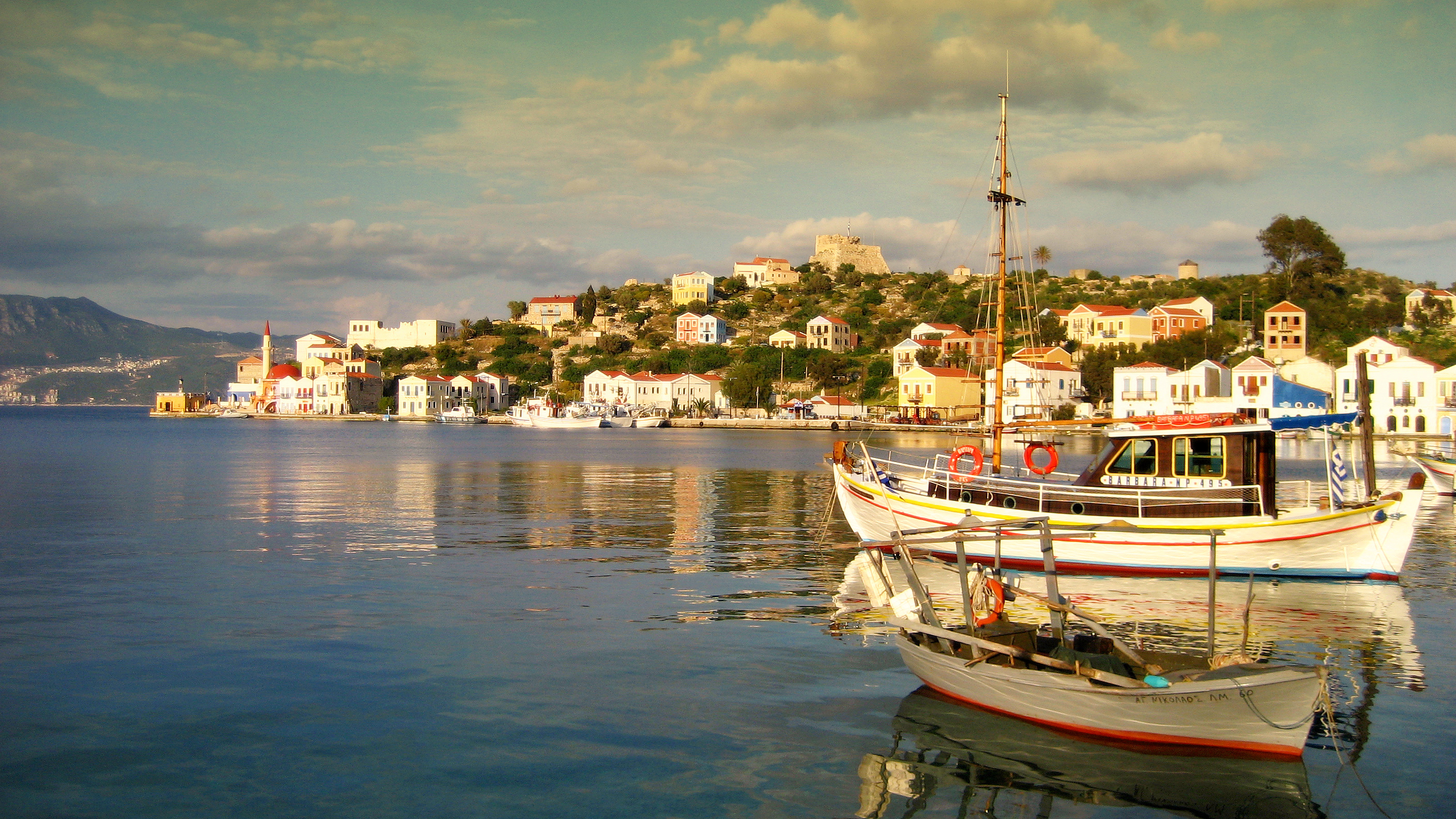
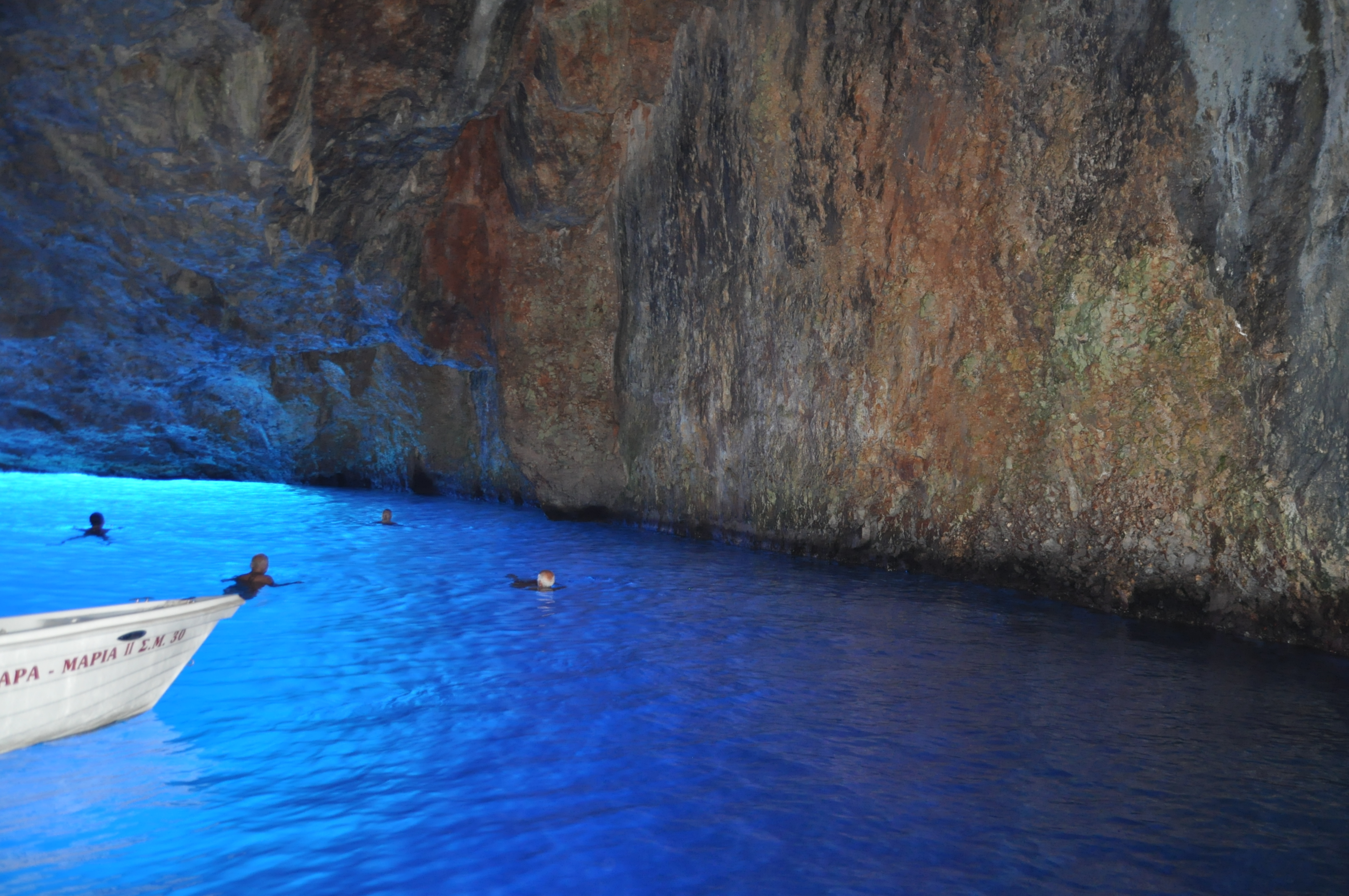
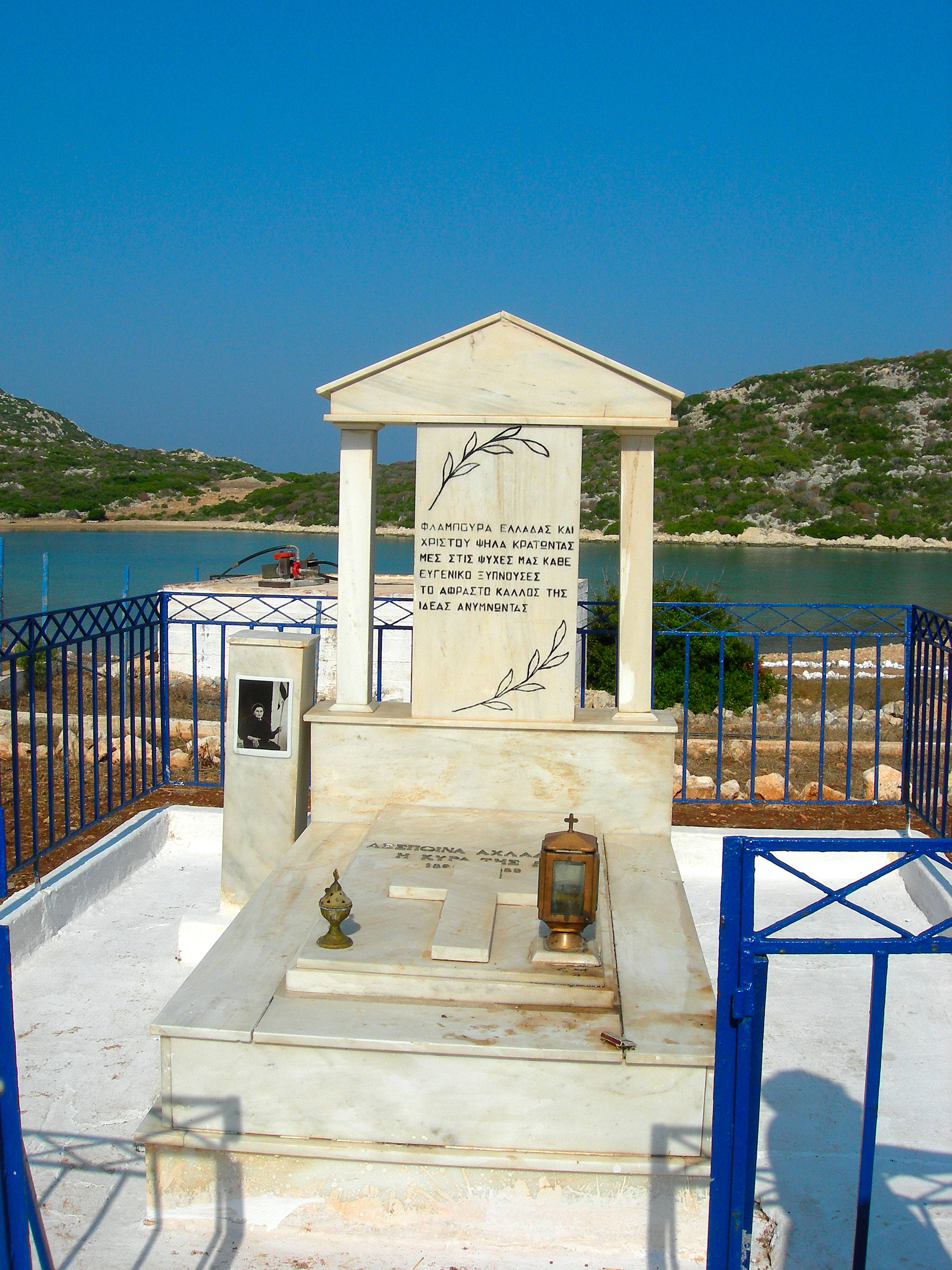
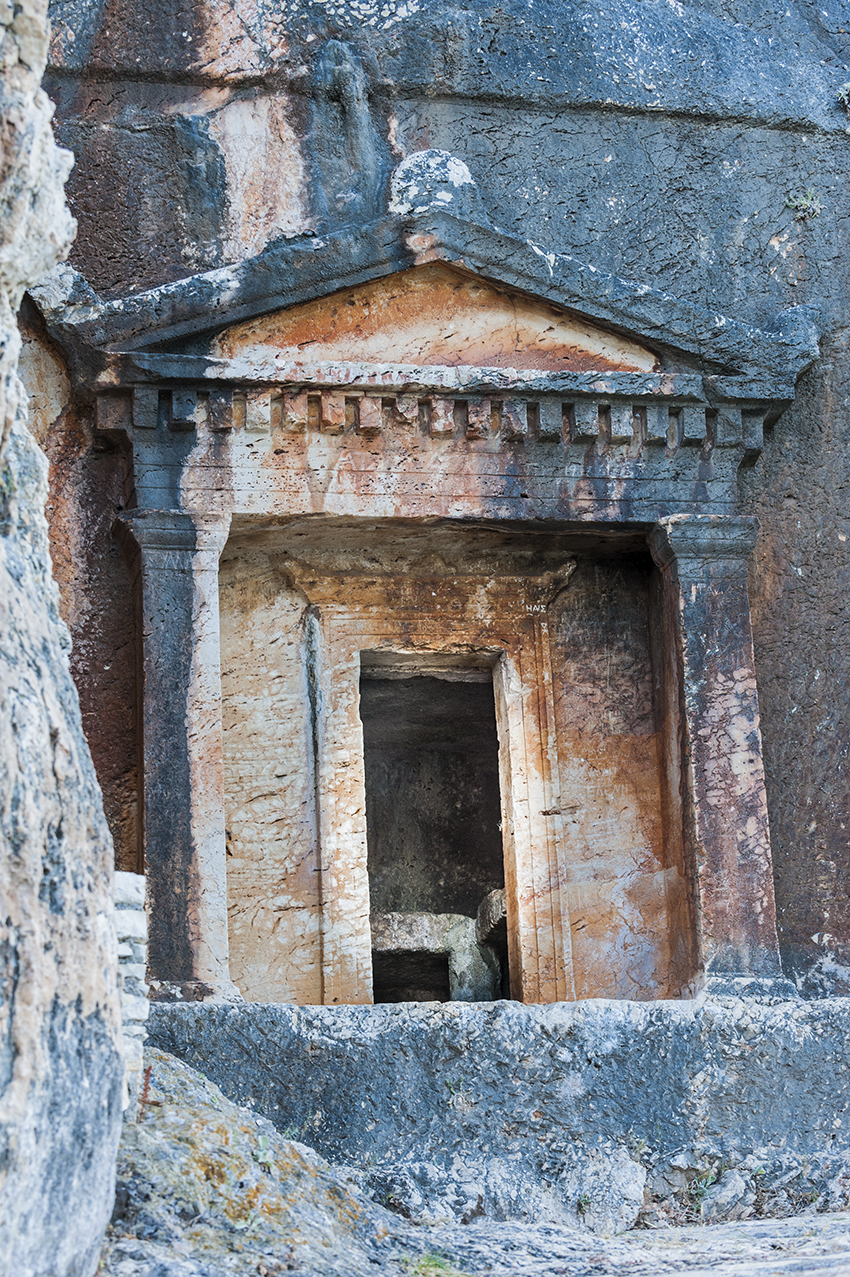
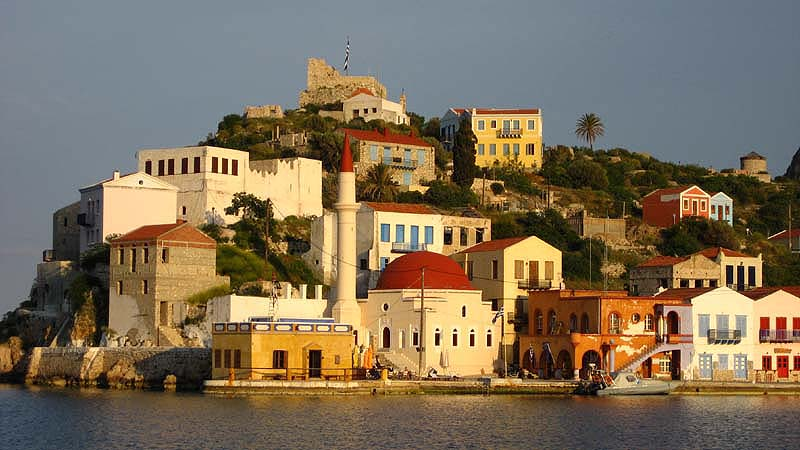
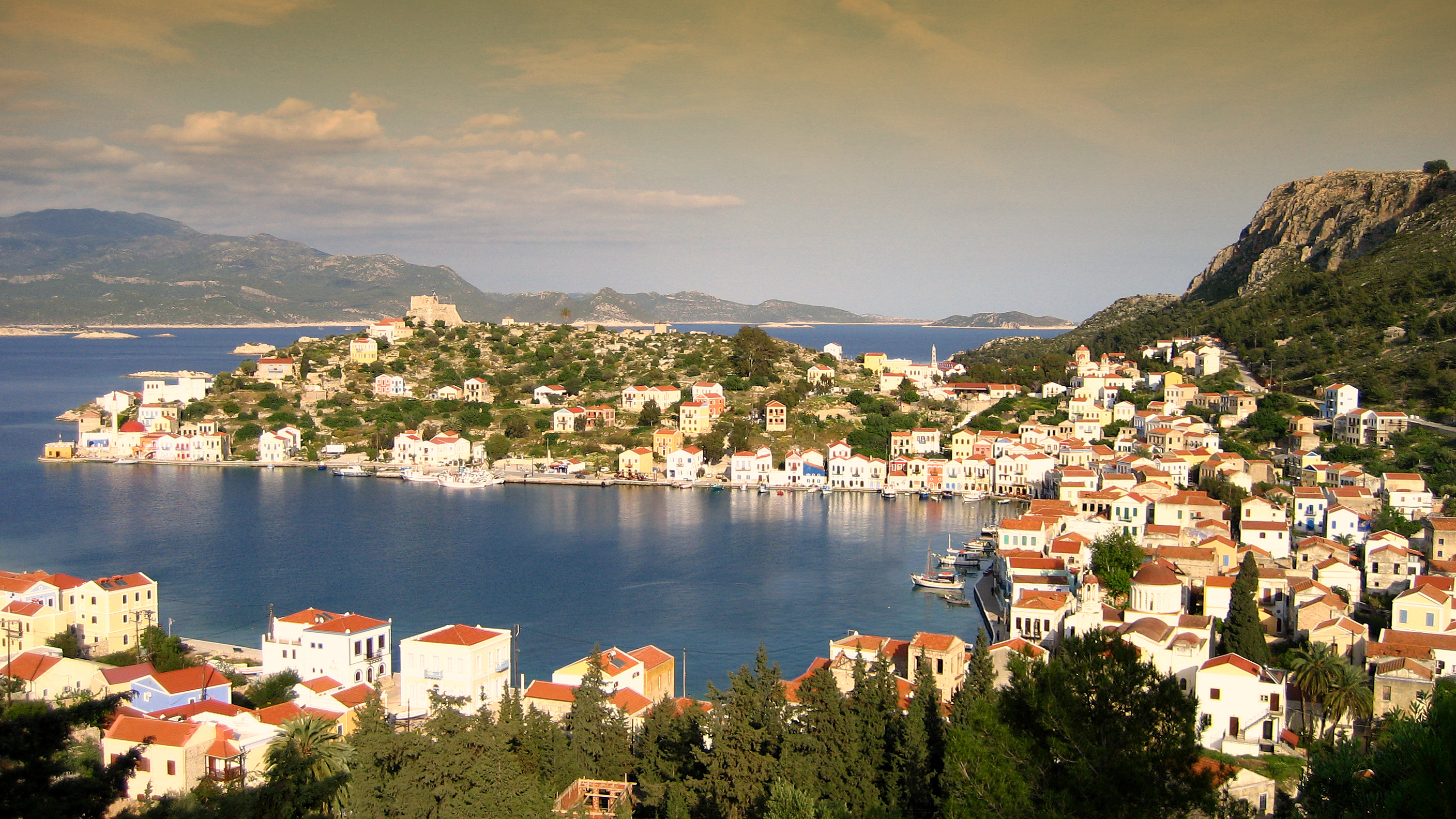
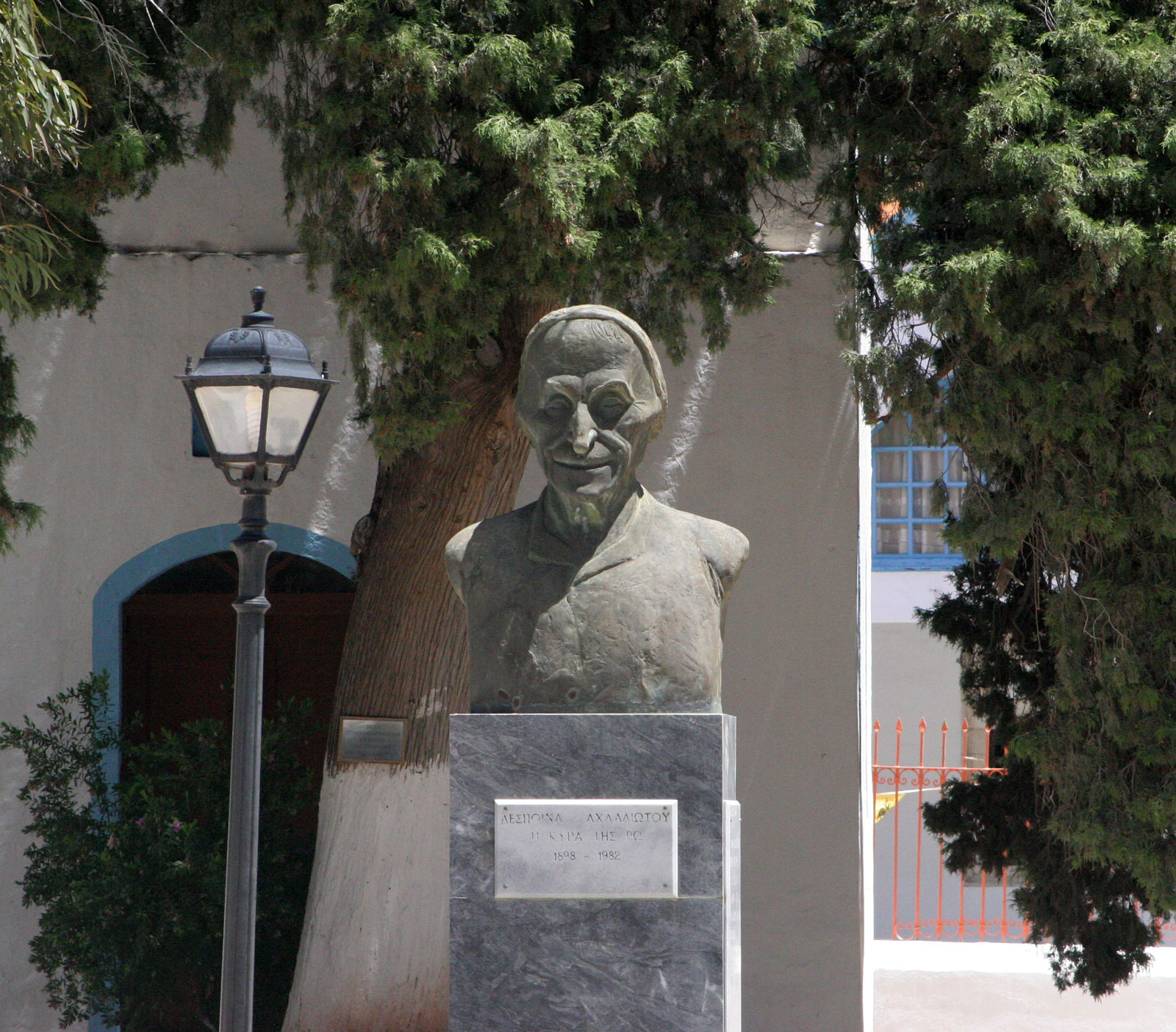
- Clockwise from the top: Port of Kastellorizo, Lady of Ro Tomb in Ro Islet, Castello Rosso along with Kastellorizo Archaeological Museum, Lady of Ro Statue, view of the town of Kastellorizo, Lycian Tomb, Fokiale Cave

- Flag Seal

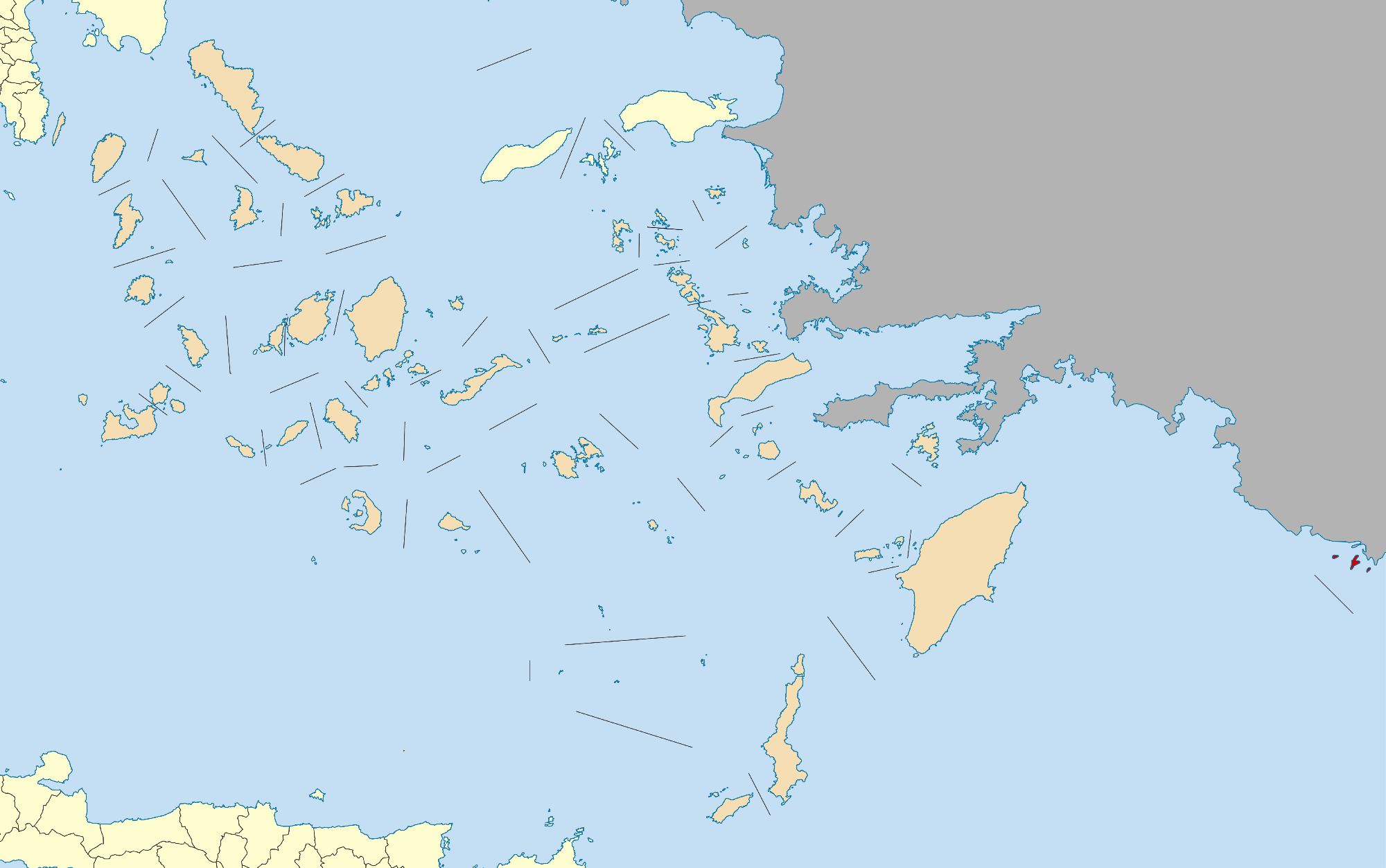

- Location within Greece
- Coordinates: 36°08′42″N 29°35′06″E
- Country: Greece
- Administrative region: South Aegean
- Regional unit: Rhodes

Government
  - Mayor: Nikolaos Asvestis (since 2023)

Area
  - Municipality: 11.98 km^{2} (4.63 sq mi)
- Highest elevation: 273 m (896 ft)
- Lowest elevation: 0 m (0 ft)

Population (2021)
  - Municipality: 594
  - Density: 49.6/km^{2} (128/sq mi)
- Demonym: Kastellorizians
- Time zone: UTC+2 (EET)
  - Summer (DST): UTC+3 (EEST)
- Postal code: 851 11
- Area code: 22460
- Vehicle registration: ΚΧ, ΡΟ, ΡΚ
- Website: Official website

Kastellorizo or Castellorizo (US: /ˌkɑːstəˈlɔːrɪzoʊ/ KAH-stə-LOR-iz-oh; Greek: Καστελλόριζο, romanized: Kastellórizo), officially Megisti (Μεγίστη, Megísti), is a Greek island and municipality of the Dodecanese in the Eastern Mediterranean. It lies roughly 2 kilometres (1 mi) off the south coast of Turkey, about 570 km (354 mi) southeast of Athens and 125 km (78 mi) east of Rhodes, almost halfway between Rhodes and Antalya, and 280 km (170 mi) northwest of Cyprus. Kastellorizo is part of the Rhodes regional unit.

The island has become very popular in recent years among tourists looking for an isolated place in the Dodecanese, thanks also to the 1991 Oscar-winning movie Mediterraneo, by Gabriele Salvatores, which is set on the island during the Second World War.

== Name and etymology ==
The island's official name, Megisti (Μεγίστη) means "biggest" or "greatest", but at only 11.98 km^{2} (4.626 sq mi) in area, it is the smallest of the Dodecanese. The name refers to the fact that it is the largest island of its small archipelago. This name was used in antiquity, but is now rarely used in Greek, the name Kastellórizo (Καστελλόριζο) being common since the 12th century. There are several hypotheses about the origin of this name. "Kastello" derives from the Italian word "castello", meaning "castle". There is some argument on the second part of the name. The arguments are centred on the following possible origins of the element rizo:

1. rizo being derived from the Italian word "rosso" meaning "red", either from the reddish colour of the rocks of the island, the reddish colour of the castle at sunset, or the colour of the coat of arms of the Great Master of the Knights of Rhodes, Juan Fernández de Heredia, which stood above the gate of the castle; these arguments are widely discredited as the rocks on the island have no red pigment and the name Kastellorizo predates the Knights' arrival.
2. rizo being a corruption of the word "Rhoge", one of the ancient appellations of the nearby island of Ro. If this is correct, the island's modern name is actually an amalgam of the separate island names "Castello" and "Rhoge".
3. rizo being the actual Greek word rizon meaning "root", as researched by Greek historian I.M. Hatzifotis (1996), to signify the foothill or rizovouno on which the island's original castle was built.

It has gone by several different names in its history, including Kastellorizo (Greek), Castellorizo (Greek name with Italian spelling), Castelrosso (Italian, meaning "Red Castle"), Château Rouge (French translation of Italian name: but possibly the Italian name is a calque of Chastel Rouge, an ancient possession of the Knights Hospitaller in Syria) and Meis or Kızılhisar, both Turkish, the former deriving from the island's official name in Greek, the latter meaning "Red Castle", a translation of the Italian name.

== Physical geography ==
Map of Kastellorizo and the surrounding islets.

Kastellorizo is (except for the nearby islet of Strongyli) the easternmost Greek island and is situated in the Levantine Sea. It is the largest island of the homonym archipelago comprising the islands and islets of Agios Georgios, Agrielaia, Voutsakia, Megalo Mavro Poini, Mikro Mavro Poini, Polifados Ena, Polifados Dio, Ro, Savoura, Strongyli, Tragonera, Psomi, and Psoradia. It lies about 2 km (1 mi) from the Anatolian coastal town of Kaş, more or less halfway between Rhodes and Antalya. Cyprus is about 280 km (170 mi) to the south-east. It is 6 km (3.7 mi) long and 3 km (1.9 mi) wide, with a surface of 9.2 km^{2} (3.6 sq mi). It has a triangular shape, and is oriented from north-east to south-west. The island features three capes: Agios Stefanos (north), Nifti (east) and Pounenti (south west); between the first two there is a wide and accommodating bay, the island's main harbor, where one finds the only town on the island. Cape Agios Stefanos, the nearest to Anatolia, is 2.25 km (1.40 mi) south of the modern Turkish town of Kaş (Greek: Andífli, the Ancient Greek City of Antiphéllos). Cape Nifti lies at a greater distance from the Anatolian coast. The island is mountainous, with high and steep coastlines, which become more difficult to access moving west. The soil is composed of limestone and produces only small amounts of olives, grapes, and beans. On the island, there is no source of drinking water. The Municipality of Megísti includes the offshore islands of Ro and Strongyli as well as several smaller islets. It has a total land area of 11.978 km^{2} (4.625 sq mi).

=== Nearby islands between Turkey and Kastellorizo ===
There are many islets in this area; Volos, near Kalkan (Greek: Kalamaki), Ochendra, Furnachia, Prassonisi, Ro, Tragonera, Marathi, Strongyli, Dhassia, Alimentaria, Kekova, and Psomi besides many rocks and cliffs. The most important among these islets is Kekova (also named Caravola), not inhabited, which has an area of 4.5 km^{2} (1.7 sq mi) and faces the Turkish village of Kaleköy (Simena in antiquity).

All these islets were subject to dispute between Italy and Turkey until 1932. According to the 1932 Convention between Italy and Turkey, all these islets except Ro, Strongyli, and Psomi were assigned to Turkey.

The group of islands that includes Kastellorizo, Ro, and Strongyli is very important to the Exclusive economic zone of Greece (EEZ), since it is the easternmost territory of Greece and according to UNCLOS as well as customary international law, Greece can claim a large part of the Eastern Mediterranean basin.

Satellite picture of the island

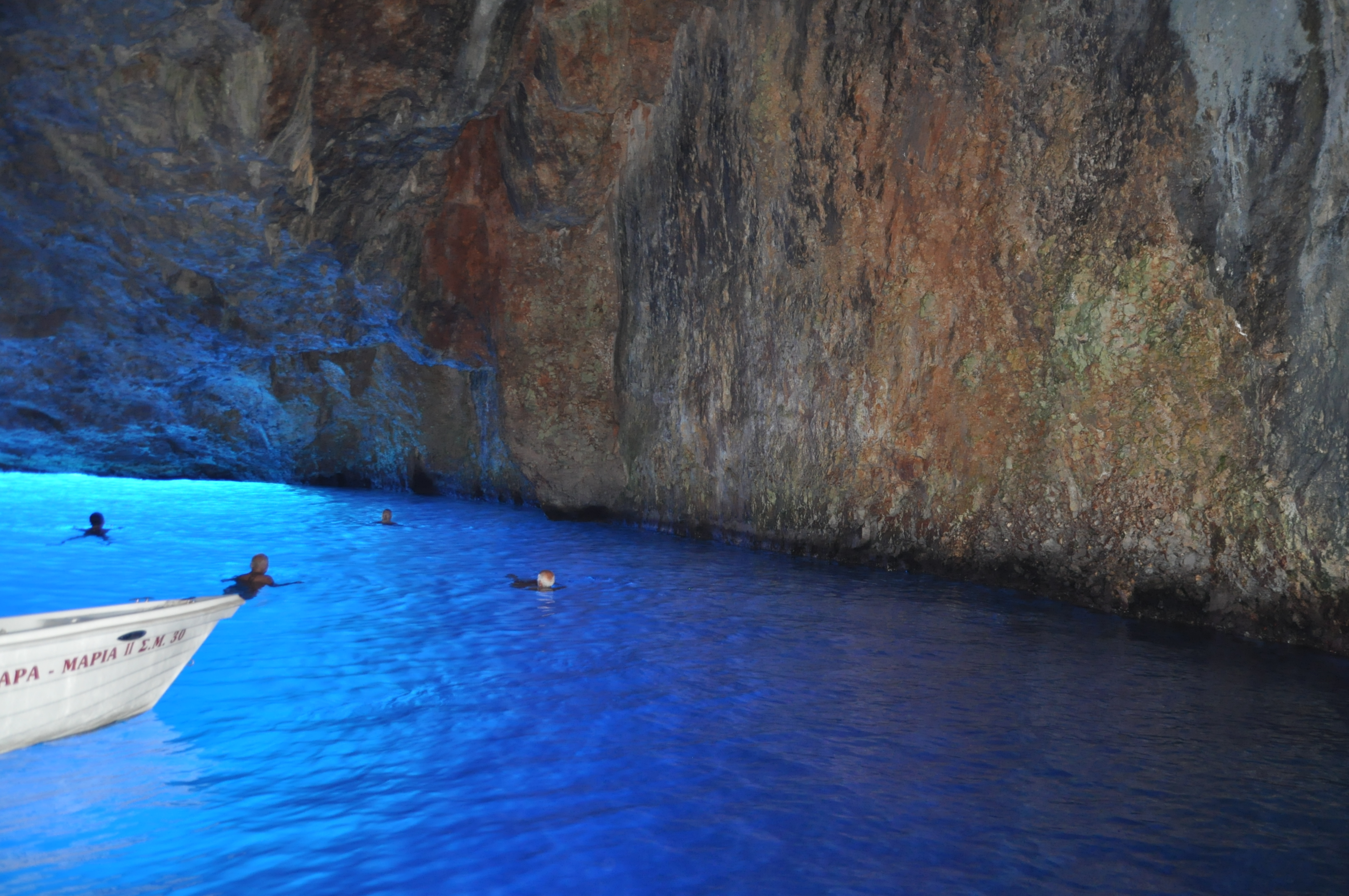
The Blue Cave

Kastellorizo within the EEZ of Greece

== Geography ==
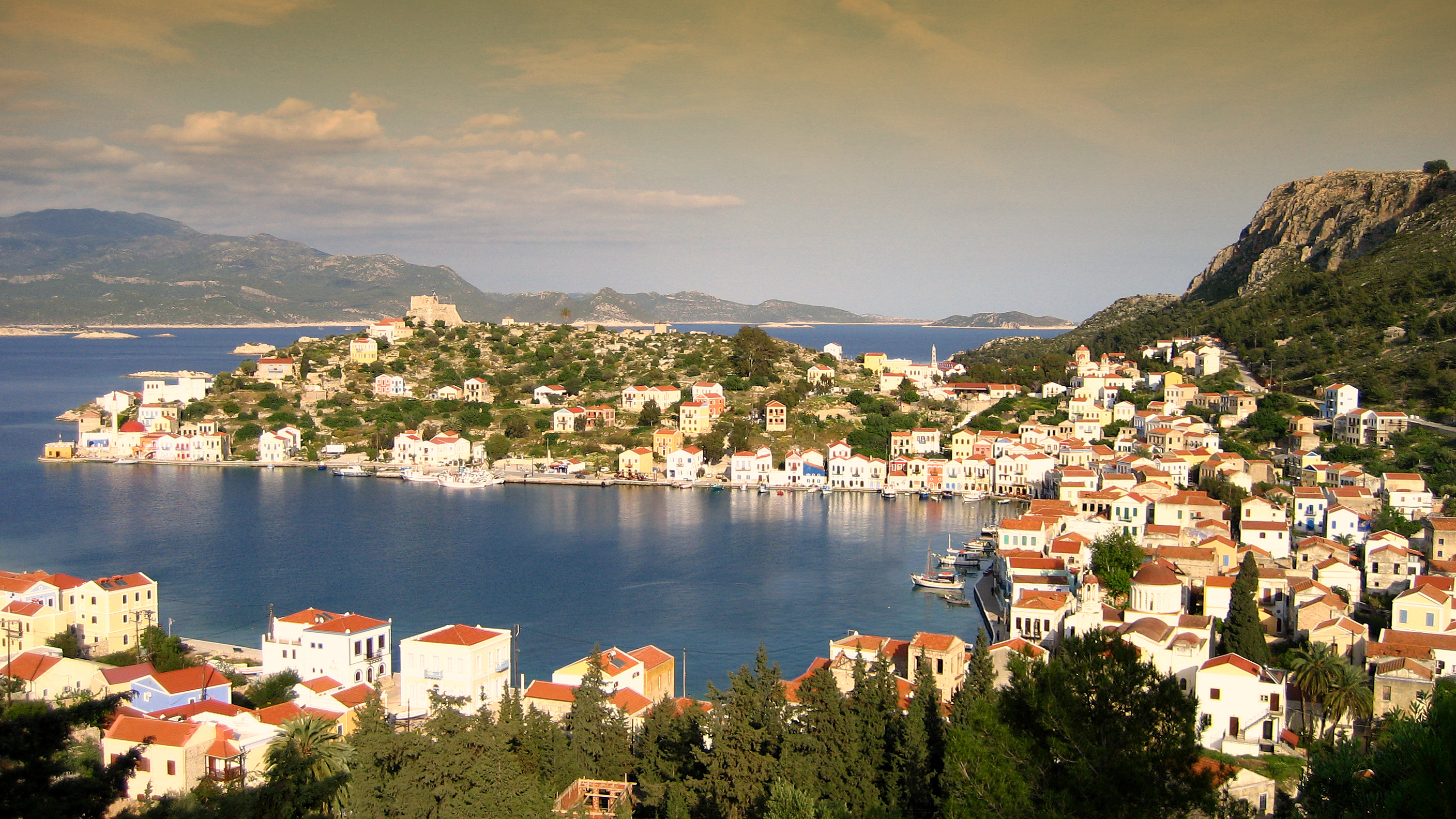
Kastellorizo town

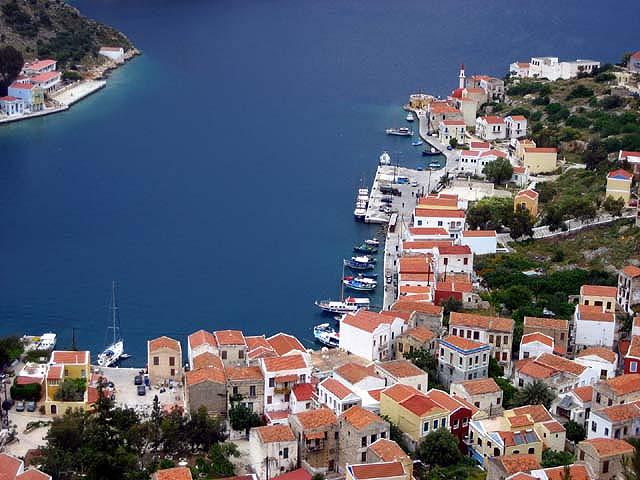
Panorama of the port.

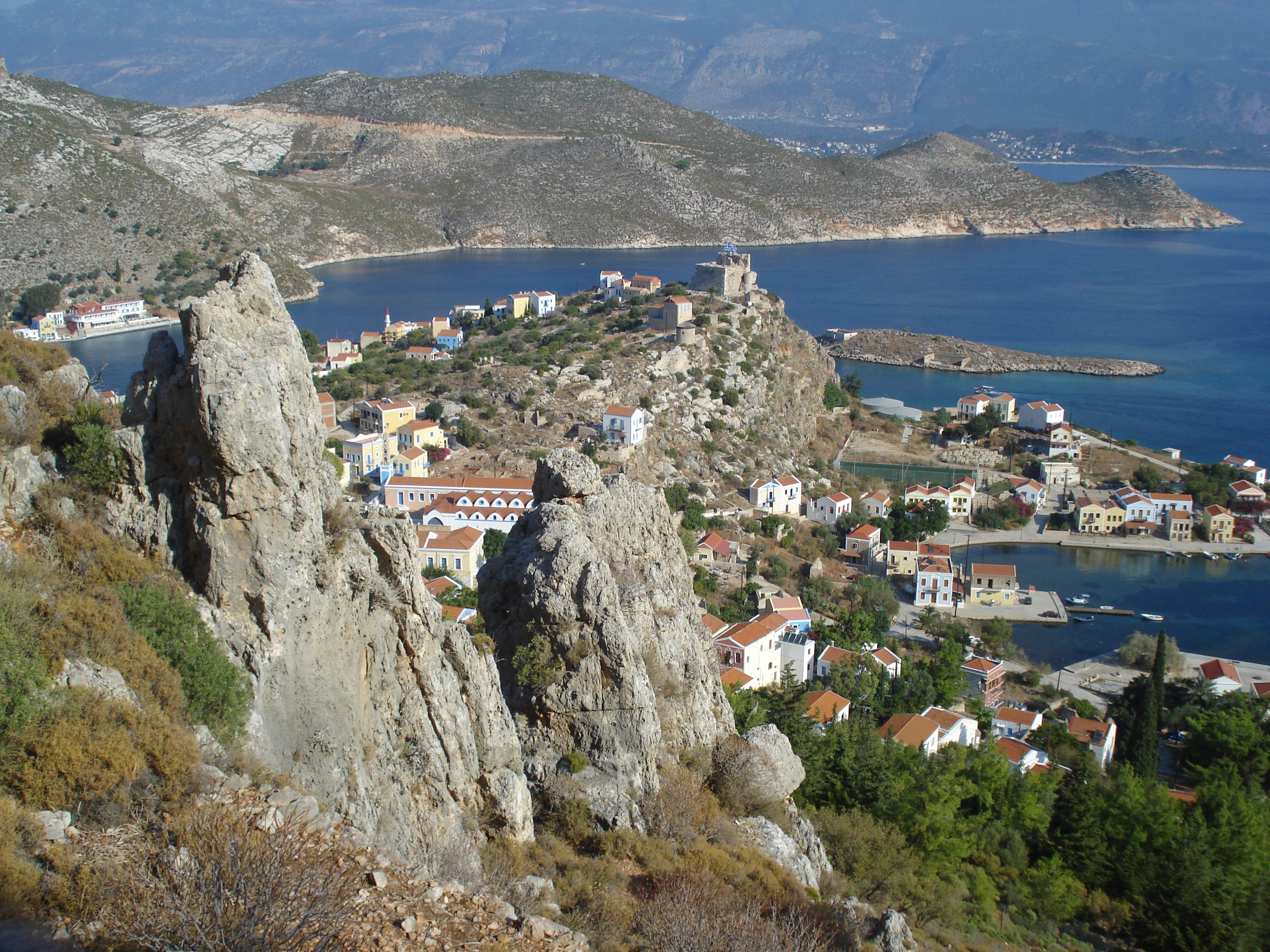
View of Mandraki, the small port.

The houses of the town are slender and characterised by wooden balconies and windows of the Anatolian type. Behind the waterfront, many houses are still in a ruinous state. At the entrance to the harbour, on the east side, stand the single-story remnants of the former Italian government house (palazzina della delegazione), erected in 1926 by the Italian architect Florestano Di Fausto, who also designed some of the most important buildings of the Italian period in Rhodes. Nearby is the island's former Ottoman mosque which dates from the second half of the 18th century and which has been restored and re-opened as a museum since 2007. From here starts the town's quay, which runs along all three sides of the harbour. The central square — Plateia Ethelondon Kastellórizou ('Kastellorizo Volunteers' Square') — lies at the midpoint of the eastern side, near the vessel dock. On the opposite side of the harbour one has a good view from this vantage of Pera Meria, the western quay, and the monasteries of Profitis Ilías and Aghia Triadha, the former now an army base.

Above the quay on the eastern side is a pathway which leads to the Castle of the Knights (14th century). Of it remain the curtain wall, part of a square tower, the remains of a cylindrical tower at the east corner, and toward the sea another cylindrical tower. A Doric inscription, carved in the rock, attests to the existence of an earlier fortress here during Antiquity. Inside the tower there is a large covered cistern.

Ascending the steps on the eastern side of the town, one reaches the suburb of Horafia, where there is a square surrounded by the Church of St. George (1906), with a high dome of Byzantine type, and the Cathedral of Saints Constantine and Helena (1835). It has three naves divided by monolithic granite columns from the temple of Apollo Lykios in Patara (Anatolia). The columns carry ogival arches. Further east is the small bay known as Mandraki, the secondary harbour of the island.

West of the town, beyond the summit of the island known as Vigla (270 m), stands Palaiokastro (old castle), the island's ancient acropolis. This fortified elevation has classical origins (see below, history section): its plan is rectangular and measures 60 by 80 metres (200 ft × 260 ft). In its interior stand an ancient tower, built with square limestone blocks, and large water cisterns. Carved on the base of the castle there is also a Doric inscription, dating back to the 4th or 3rd centuries BC, with references to Megiste (the ancient name of Kastellorizo) and its dependence on Rhodes. On the east side there are remnants of a gateway, or propylaea.

Since August 2020 the island also features an interactive Puzzle Museum, the first of its kind in Greece and one of the very few in the world.

=== Climate ===
Kastellorizo has a hot-summer Mediterranean climate (Csa in the Köppen climate classification). It has hot dry summers and exceptionally mild winters by European standards. Like in the Azores, average lows do not drop below 12.0 °C during the coldest months. According to the National Observatory of Athens station the lowest temperature ever recorded in coastal Kastellorizo is 4.5 °C and was recorded on 25 January 2022. Kastellorizo records on average 158 tropical nights per year and falls in 11a hardiness zone. After Lindos, the island records the highest average annual temperature in Greece with 21.9 °C.

Climate data for Kastellorizo 5 m a.s.l. Climate: Hot-summer Mediterranean climate (Csa) • USDA: 11a (6.53°C)
Month	Jan	Feb	Mar	Apr	May	Jun	Jul	Aug	Sep	Oct	Nov	Dec	Year
Record high °C (°F)	20.6 (69.1)	22.3 (72.1)	26.2 (79.2)	29.6 (85.3)	34.8 (94.6)	40.8 (105.4)	40.8 (105.4)	40.3 (104.5)	36.6 (97.9)	37.4 (99.3)	27.7 (81.9)	23.2 (73.8)	40.8 (105.4)
Mean daily maximum °C (°F)	16.8 (62.2)	17.0 (62.6)	18.6 (65.5)	21.8 (71.2)	26.2 (79.2)	30.3 (86.5)	34.1 (93.4)	33.6 (92.5)	31.2 (88.2)	27.0 (80.6)	22.9 (73.2)	18.7 (65.7)	24.8 (76.7)
Daily mean °C (°F)	14.6 (58.3)	14.6 (58.3)	15.8 (60.4)	18.6 (65.5)	22.6 (72.7)	26.5 (79.7)	30.1 (86.2)	30.2 (86.4)	28.2 (82.8)	24.2 (75.6)	20.5 (68.9)	16.5 (61.7)	21.9 (71.4)
Mean daily minimum °C (°F)	12.4 (54.3)	12.2 (54.0)	13.0 (55.4)	15.5 (59.9)	19.0 (66.2)	22.8 (73.0)	26.1 (79.0)	26.9 (80.4)	25.2 (77.4)	21.5 (70.7)	18.0 (64.4)	14.3 (57.7)	18.9 (66.0)
Record low °C (°F)	4.5 (40.1)	5.5 (41.9)	5.2 (41.4)	10.7 (51.3)	15.2 (59.4)	17.8 (64.0)	22.9 (73.2)	24.7 (76.5)	20.3 (68.5)	15.8 (60.4)	11.3 (52.3)	8.3 (46.9)	4.5 (40.1)
Average rainfall mm (inches)	140.2 (5.52)	62.3 (2.45)	51.7 (2.04)	22.7 (0.89)	7.0 (0.28)	7.4 (0.29)	0.3 (0.01)	0.0 (0.0)	7.7 (0.30)	22.6 (0.89)	79.8 (3.14)	192.3 (7.57)	594 (23.38)
Source 1: National Observatory of Athens Monthly Bulletins (Sep 2018 – Mar 2026)
Source 2: Kastellorizo N.O.A station and World Meteorological Organization

=== Geology ===
The island's geology is almost exclusively limestone laid down at the Mesozoic/Cenozoic boundary. As a result of the lack of significant flora covering the island, the landscape shows many features of karstification. There are several notable sea caves including the so-called Blue Grotto which is much larger than its namesake in Capri. Exploration undertaken in 2006 by members of the SELAS Caving club of Greece has revealed vertical caves in many parts of the island. The deepest found so far was surveyed to a depth of 60 m (200 ft) in March 2006 and will be the subject of further exploration in the future by the same team.

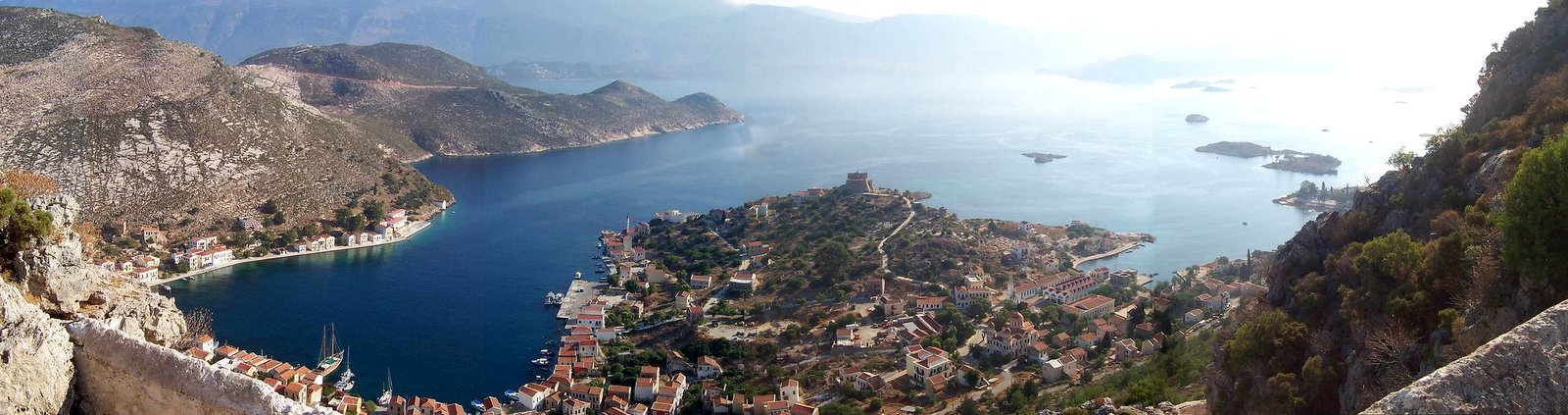
Panorama of Kastellorizo.

== History ==
=== Ancient period ===
The island was colonised by Dorian Greeks, who named it "Megiste". In antiquity it was known both as Megiste and Cisthene (Greek: Κισθήνη), but in later times only as Megiste. The Periplus of Pseudo-Scylax says that the island belonged to the Rhodians. In addition, inscriptions found at the foot of the Knight's castle confirm that during the Hellenistic period the island was ruled by Rhodes, and formed part of its Peraia. The Rhodians sent an overseer, or epistates, to monitor events on the island.

The three towers of Kastellorizo, Ro and Strongyli comprise the main links in a dense network of watchtowers constructed by the Rhodians during the Hellenistic period, to control the sea routes and the coast. Palaiokastro was (and still is) the main and largest fortified site on the island.

=== Byzantine era ===
During the Byzantine period, Kastellorizo was part of the "Province of the Islands", the capital of which was Rhodes. Later it was incorporated into the theme of Aegean Sea.

=== Knights Hospitaller period ===
In 1306 the island was taken over by the Knights Hospitaller, headed by Foulques de Villaret, as part of their expedition to conquer the island of Rhodes, which became the centre of their Crusader state. They restored the castle, which was thereafter used as a prison for disobedient knights.

Nicola de Martoni, who visited the island in 1395, recorded in his work that the residents of Kastellorizo owned many vineyards on the opposite shore and they were able to regularly cross the water to tend to these crops due to a truce with the Turks at the time.

Around 1440, the island was occupied by Sultan Sayf ad-Din Jaqmaq of Egypt, who destroyed the castle. Ten years later, it was conquered by Alfonso V of Aragon, king of Naples, who in 1461 rebuilt the castle and dispatched a Catalan governor.

=== Ottoman era ===
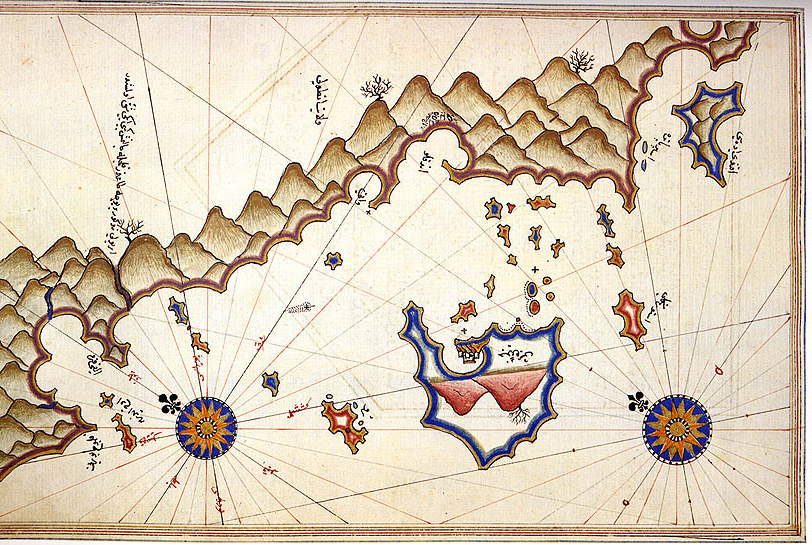
Map of Kastellorizo by Piri Reis (1521)

The Crown of Aragon retained possession of it until 1512, when it was conquered by Ottoman Sultan Suleiman I.

On 22 September 1659, during the Siege of Candia, the island was conquered by Venice and the castle was destroyed again, but the Ottomans were able to regain it soon after. Between 1828 and 1833 Kastellórizo joined the Greek insurgents, but after the end of the Greek War of Independence it came back into the possession of the Ottoman Empire.

According to the Ottoman General Census of 1881/'82–1893, the kaza of Kastellorizo (Meyis) had a total population of 4,871, consisting of 4,635 Greeks, 225 Muslims, 6 Jews and 5 foreign citizens.

In 1912, during the Libyan war between Italy and the Ottoman Empire, the inhabitants asked Giovanni Battista Ameglio, chief of the Italian occupation forces in Rhodes, for their island to be annexed to Italy. This was refused, and on 14 March 1913 the local population imprisoned the governor and his Ottoman garrison and proclaimed a provisional government. In August 1913, the Greek government sent from Samos a provisional governor supported by gendarmes, but in early 1914 in Florence it was decided that the island would be returned to the Ottoman Empire.

=== World War I ===
During World War I, while the Kingdom of Greece was still neutral, French Navy warships led by the cruiser Jeanne d'Arc occupied Kastellorizo on 28 December 1915 at the behest of local inhabitants who feared Ottoman reprisals. The French quickly blocked another landing attempted on the same day by a Hellenic Army detachment of Evzones. Ottoman shore batteries responded to the French occupation by shelling the island in 1917, which resulted in the sinking of the British Royal Navy seaplane carrier HMS Ben-my-Chree.

=== Italian period ===
In the Treaty of Sèvres the island was assigned to Italy and the Italian navy assumed it from the French on 1 March 1921, but the treaty was never ratified. The Treaty of Lausanne confirmed the Italian claim on Kastellorizo, and the island – under the Italian name "Castelrosso" – was then integrated into the possession of the Isole Italiane dell'Egeo.

Because of the Italian occupation, the island was not affected directly by the population exchange between Greece and Turkey of 1923, but the forced emigration of the large Greek population living on the nearby Anatolian coast hit the economy of the island heavily.

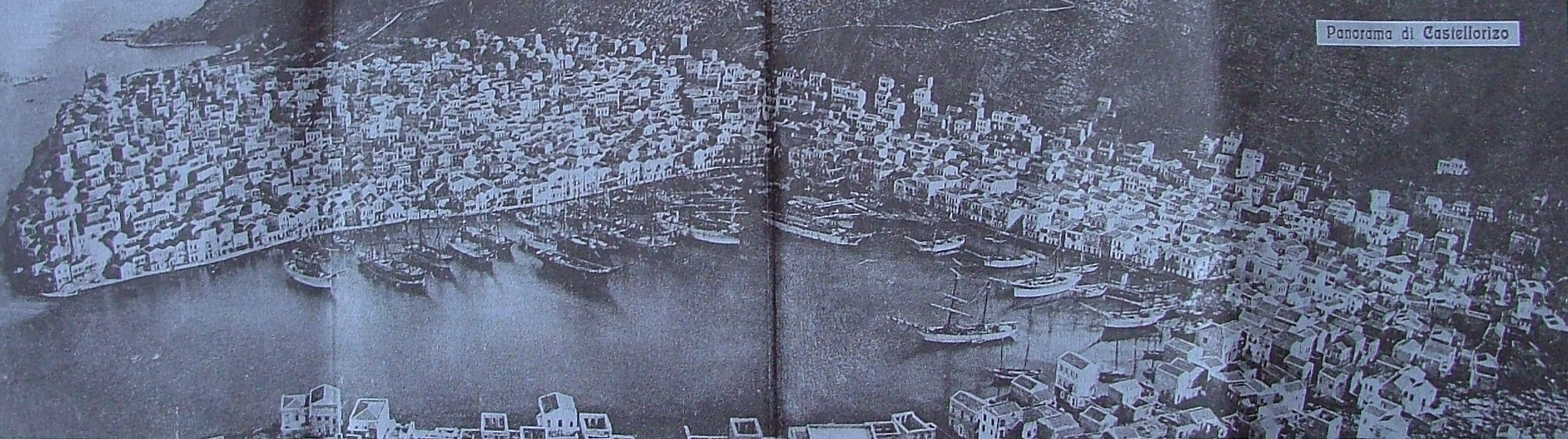
Panoramic view of Kastellorizo harbour in 1921.

The 1932 Convention between Italy and Turkey, which defined the sea border between the two powers, assigned all the islets of the small archipelago around Kastellorizo except Ro and Strongyli to Turkey. During the 1930s it was a stopover for French and British seaplanes. During the Second World War, on 25 February 1941, in the course of Operation Abstention, British Commandos occupied the island, but Italian forces from Rhodes recaptured it some days later. When Italy capitulated to the Allies (8 September 1943), the island was occupied again by Allied forces, and it remained under their occupation for the rest of the war. In July 1944, a fuel dump caught fire, which spread to an adjacent ammunition dump, thereby destroying half of the homes on the island.

=== Modern Greek era ===
Kastellorizo was assigned to Greece with the Paris Peace Treaties, 1947. In May 1945 it was still under British administration, but on 15 September 1947 effectively came under Greek administration. The island formally joined the Greek State on 7 March 1948 together with the other Dodecanese islands.

The island has become more popular in recent years, among tourists looking for an isolated place in the Dodecanese, thanks also to the 1991 Oscar-winning movie Mediterraneo, by Gabriele Salvatores, which is set on the island. Kastellórizo was the only territory of the European Union where the solar eclipse of 29 March 2006, was visible in its totality.

In 2011, the French ship Dignité-Al Karama, the only member the Freedom Flotilla II that managed to approach Gaza, refuelled at Kastellorizo.

== Demographics and economy ==
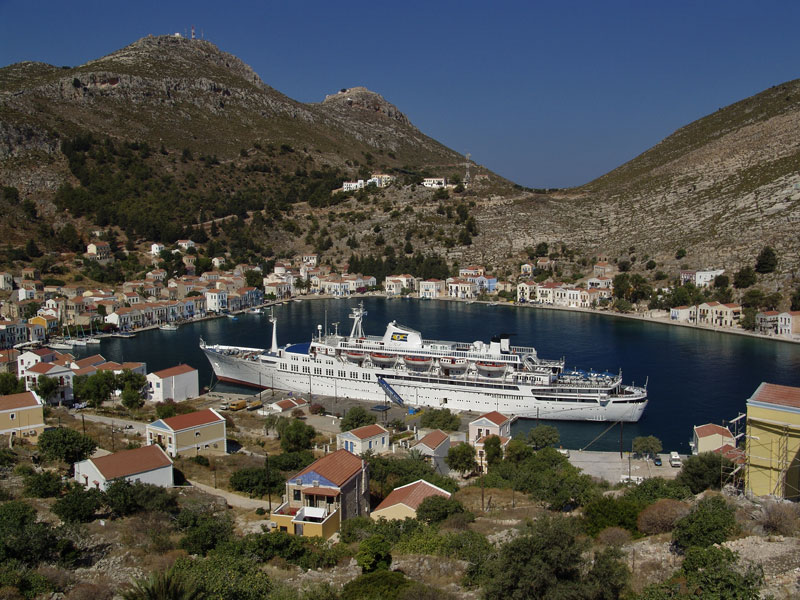
CS Salamis Glory in Kastellorizo harbour.

The population rose from 4,870 in the 1880s and reached its peak in 1908 with an estimated 9,000 people residing there. At that time, Kastellorizo was still the only safe harbour along the route between Makri (today's Fethiye) and Beirut. Its sailing ships traded products from Anatolia (coal, timber, valonia, pine bark) for Egyptian goods (rice, sugar, coffee, tissues, and yarns), and carried Anatolian cereals to Rhodes and Cyprus. On the island there was also a flourishing production of charcoal (much sought after in Alexandria, where it was used for narghile). The fishing industry — mainly sea sponges — was important too.

After 1908, the decay of the island's economy set in, accelerated by the decline of the Ottoman Empire and the population exchange between Greece and Turkey in 1923. In the late 1920s the island's population dropped to 3,000, while about 8,000 inhabitants lived abroad, predominantly in Australia, Egypt, Greece and the U.S. At that time the town had 730 inhabited houses, while 675 were already empty, and many ruined.

The population continued to drop to 584 at the 1951 census, reaching a low point of 222 at the 1981 census, before slowly rising again to 594 at the 2021 census, all living in the town of Megísti. The municipality also includes the islands of Ro and Strongyli, both without permanent inhabitants. Many of its emigrants live in Australia (especially Perth and Sydney), where they are known as "Kazzies".

The existence of a Muslim community on the island during the Ottoman period can be deduced from the presence of a mosque with a minaret that still exists but by 1929 was no longer functioning.

== Transport ==
The island is connected with Rhodes, Piraeus, and Kaş by ferry. Passenger ferries' frequency is as follows:

- Kastellorizo - Rhodes - Symi - Tilos - Nisyros - Kalymnos - Piraeus: 2 trips/week (winter period)
- Kastellorizo - Kaş: 1 trip/week (winter period)

Air connection is provided by Olympic Air, which operates from Kastellorizo Airport 4 times/week (winter period). There is one small bus in service on Kastellorizo, and it is used to collect tourists from the airport.

== Culture ==
Kastellorizo's inhabitants had characteristic traditions, partly influenced by the Muslim tradition. There were at least three types of women's dress, which used brilliantly coloured fabric, and women wore necklaces, brooches, pendants, and earrings made from ancient Venetian or Byzantine gold coins.

The women's festive dress consisted of:

- One or more long silk blouses (ipokámiso). The most external one was closed on the front by six large filigreed gold or silver buttons. These buttons were shaped as a half-sphere depressed in the middle. From the lowest one was hung a small chain with a cross.
- A pair of short pants (katofóri) whose lower part was made with good quality material quilted with gold thread.
- A sleeved jacket (zepuni) made with brilliant colored silk or velvet, opened at the front.
- Another long underskirt (kavadi), laced with gold thread, also opened at the front.
- A large scarf (zosma) made with three or four silk strips, quilted with gold or silver thread. It was tied very low on the sides, like a loose belt.
- A large velvet coat (gunna) decorated with gold and silver lace on the hems and on the back, with fur lapels. It was always kept open.
- A woolen cap.
- A quadrangular wrinkled silken shawl (mandili), decorated with relief flowers and fringed hems, coloured in white, red and deep blue. Folded diagonally, it was fixed above the cap, with its longest angle falling on the back almost to the ground, while the side edges were folded on the front or put over the shoulders.
- The socks were woven with multicolored wool or silk.
- The shoes were shaped like tipped slippers, and were made of velvet or silk. They were laced with gold or silver thread and shorter than the foot.

The other types of dress were similar, but not so lavish and without fur decorations. The girls' dress was simpler. Single and engaged girls, and married women and widows were also distinguished by dress.

=== Religion, customs and superstitions ===
The engagement, which was decided by the parents, and the wedding, which lasted 15 days, occurred through prescribed and curious ceremonies, having symbolic and poetic meaning. Weddings were celebrated on Sunday, in the church of Agios Konstantinos, and an announcement on the main square invited the whole city to participate. Also baptisms and funerals (with mourning women, or praeficae, and a dish with oil and wine crushed on the coffin) had well-established rituals.

On 31 December and on New Year's Day, groups of children carrying small cardboard boats adorned with ribbons and small flags go around visiting houses, stores and coffee shops, singing songs with good wishes and receiving coins and wheat cakes, while the elderly exchange visits. On the morning of the Basil of Caesarea day, coming back from Liturgy, the men customarily throw a pomegranate hard against the walls of their homes, wishing for abundance and happiness for their family. The more seeds that are spread around the rooms, the more luck the family will have in the coming year.

The day before the feast of Agios Elias on 19 July (the feast itself is on 20 July) first the children and then the men jump into the sea, and wear their wet clothes the whole day. Those who do not want to participate are sometimes forced to do so.

On Easter, the Liturgy of the Resurrection takes place in the open at midnight, the faithful bearing candles. As soon as the bells start ringing, the young people let off fireworks, and the people tell each other the ritual words "Christ is resurrected". Then everyone enters the church and lights his candle from the holy fire held by the priest, and then goes home to light the fire in the fireplace. On Easter Monday the whole population gathers in the main square, and they remain there the whole day eating, drinking and singing. In the past single girls had to stay at home, but they were allowed to stay in the entrance, where they sang and played with swings.

On May 1, at dawn, all the girls of the island, in groups, each one carrying a jar, went to get water outside of town, but they were not allowed to speak a single word during the route. This water (Amilito Neró, 'water of silence') was supposed to bring good luck to the family. Everyone washed him/herself with it that day, and every utensil and wall of the house was splashed with it. When a girl became engaged, she filled a crystal carafe with it and brought it to her future mother-in-law, who gave her in return a special cake and an odd number of gold coins.

When a child became seriously ill, a woman with knowledge of prayers against the evil eye was invited to their home. She drew signs of the cross on the body of the child with a thurible filled with embers and branches of the olive tree which had been gathered in the church on Palm Sunday, pronouncing the following words: "Christ came: then he laid down his stick and chased away the snake and the bad neighbour from our home". After this exorcism, the woman would throw the contents of the thurible into a bucket filled with water, and then count the pieces of wood which did not burn. This number was said to be equal to the number of persons who were supposed to have enchanted the sick child. The enchantment of the child was sure, if the olive leaves burned with a loud crackling sound.

When a man was going to emigrate, gentle, sorrowful songs were sung to him by his friends.

== Notable people ==
- John Mangos, journalist
- Georgios Mavros, politician
- Andrew Liveris, businessman
- Nicholas Paspalis, pearl diver and creator of Paspaley pearling company
- Ken Michael, former Governor of Western Australia
- Nick Bolkus, former senator from South Australia
- Basil Zempilas, television presenter, socialite, Mayor of Perth
- Steve Malaxos, Australian rules footballer
- Lady of Ro, patriot
- Michael Kailis, businessman

== Twin towns – sister cities ==
Kastellorizo is twinned with:

- Perth, Western Australia, Australia
- Antalya, Turkey

== Cinema and popular culture ==
In the 1961 film The Guns of Navarone, a saboteur team led by Anthony Quayle is briefed on its mission at Castelrosso. The Italian 1991 movie Mediterraneo was filmed on the island.

Kastellorizo also lends its name to David Gilmour's instrumental track "Castellorizon" from his album On an Island (2006). He stayed on the island in the early 1990s with his wife, Polly Samson, and many close friends. The music reflects the memories of the time spent there, and is a tribute to the friends who have since died.

== See also ==
- Kastellorizo-Kaş swim
- List of Crusader castles

== Sources ==
- Bertarelli, L.V. (1929). Guida d'Italia, Vol. XVII (in Italian). Milano: Consociazione Turistica Italiana.
- Hatzifotis, I.M. (1996). Kastellorizon. Athens: Topio Publications.
- Köchler, Hans (2020). Kastellorizo: The Geopolitics of Maritime Boundaries and the Dysfunctionality of the Law of the Sea. Vienna: International Progress Organization.
- Pappas, Nicholas (1994). Castellorizo: An Illustrated History of the Island and its Conquerors. Sydney: Halstead Press.
- Pappas, Nicholas (2002). Near Eastern Dreams: The French Occupation of Castellorizo 1915–1921. Sydney: Halstead Press.
- The Princeton Encyclopedia of Classical Sites, Megiste.
