= Despina Achladiotou =

Greek patriot

- "Lady of Ro", Κυρά της Ρω
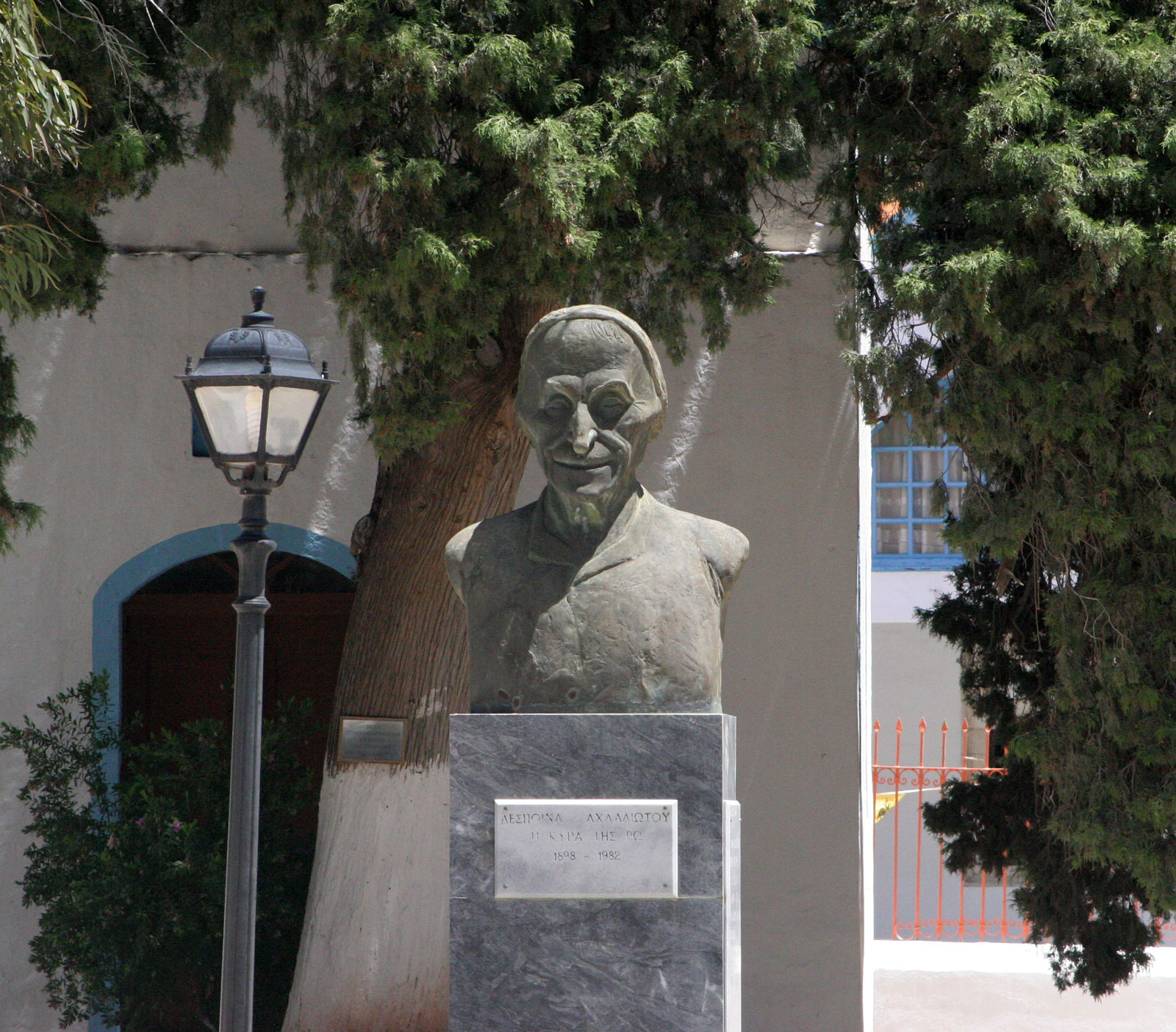
- Monument of Despina Achladiotou in Kastellorizo
- Born: c. 1890; Kastellorizo, Vilayet of the islands, Ottoman Empire (now Kastellorizo, Greece)
- Died: 13 May 1982 (aged 92); Kastellorizo, Dodecanese, Greece
- Resting place: Ro, Dodecanese, Greece
- Known for: Flying the Greek flag on the island of Ro whilst living there as a hermit
- Notable work: Member of the Greek Resistance during World War II

Despina Achladiotou (Greek: Δέσποινα Αχλαδιώτου), more commonly known as the "Lady of Ro" (Κυρά της Ρω), was a Greek patriot who lived on the island of Ro; part of the small archipelago of Kastellorizo. She was notable for being the sole resident of the island, and for daily raising the Greek flag, from the time she arrived there until her death.

== Biography ==
Despina Achladiotou was born on the island of Kastellorizo, in c. 1890. In 1927, she sailed with her husband, Kostas Achladiotis (Greek: Κώστας Αχλαδιώτης), to the nearby deserted island of Ro where they lived off of a few goats, chickens, and a vegetable garden. In 1940, when her husband got sick, Achladiotou started three fires in order to inform the residents of Kastellorizo that they needed help, but her husband died on a boat which came to help. Achladiotou then brought her blind mother to the island, while later she personally rowed her mother's remains back to Kastellorizo for burial. She has been compared to Joan d'Arc and Boudica.

Achladiotou's most renowned deed is that every day she would fly a Greek flag over the island, even though the island was not formally part of Greece (as with the rest of the Dodecanese controlled by Italy) until 1948. During World War II, she helped the members of the Sacred Band against the Axis powers.

She raised the flag every day, regardless of the weather, from the time she arrived on the island until her death on 13 May 1982, at the age of 92. Despite not having veteran status, she was buried on the island with full military honours.

A Greek military unit is now based on the island, with the main duty of keeping the tradition of raising the flag.

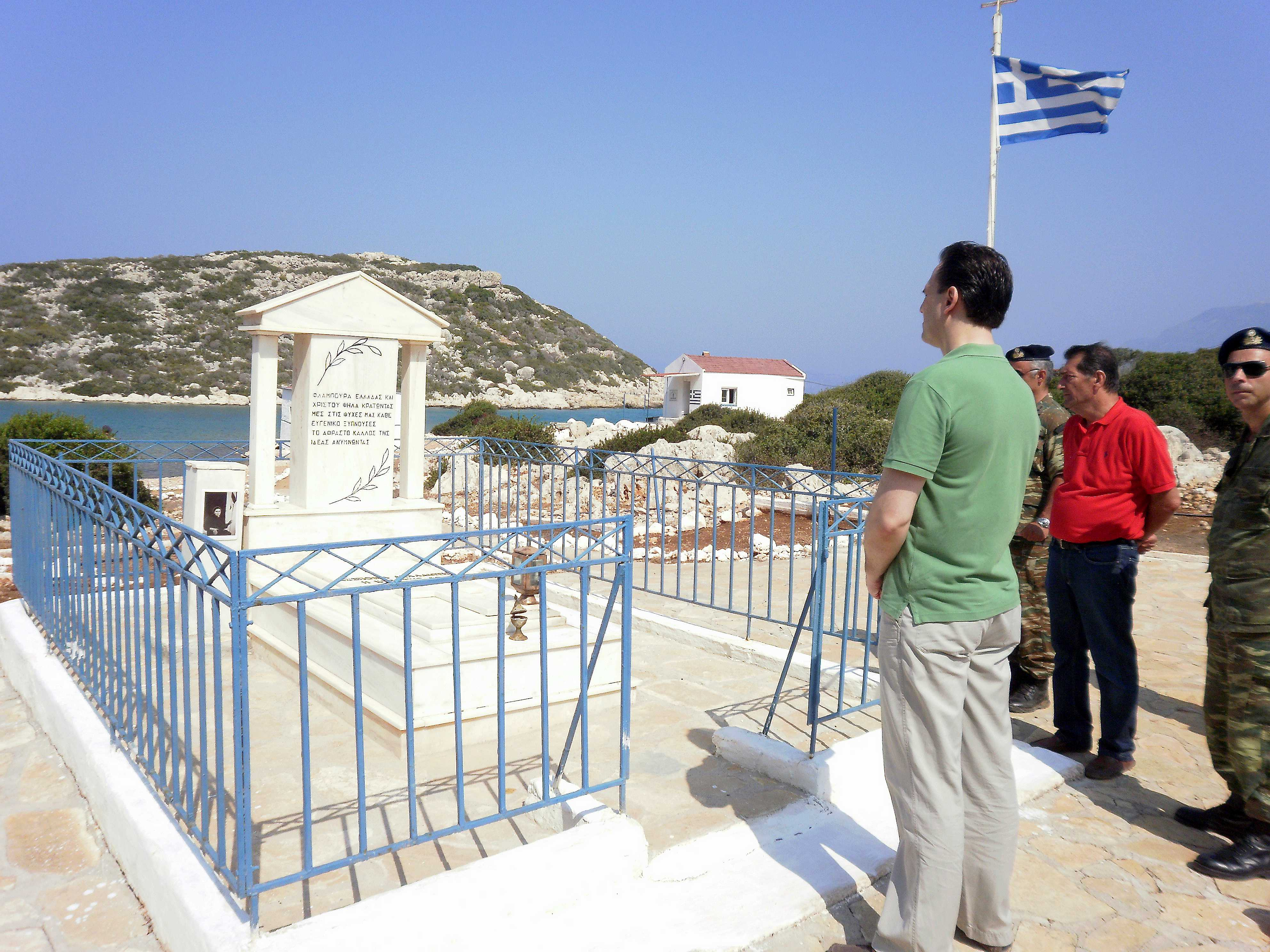
Tomb of Despina Achladiotou on the Ro island
