= Kara Ada (Bodrum) =

Island in Turkey

Coordinates: 36°58′26″N 27°27′45″E

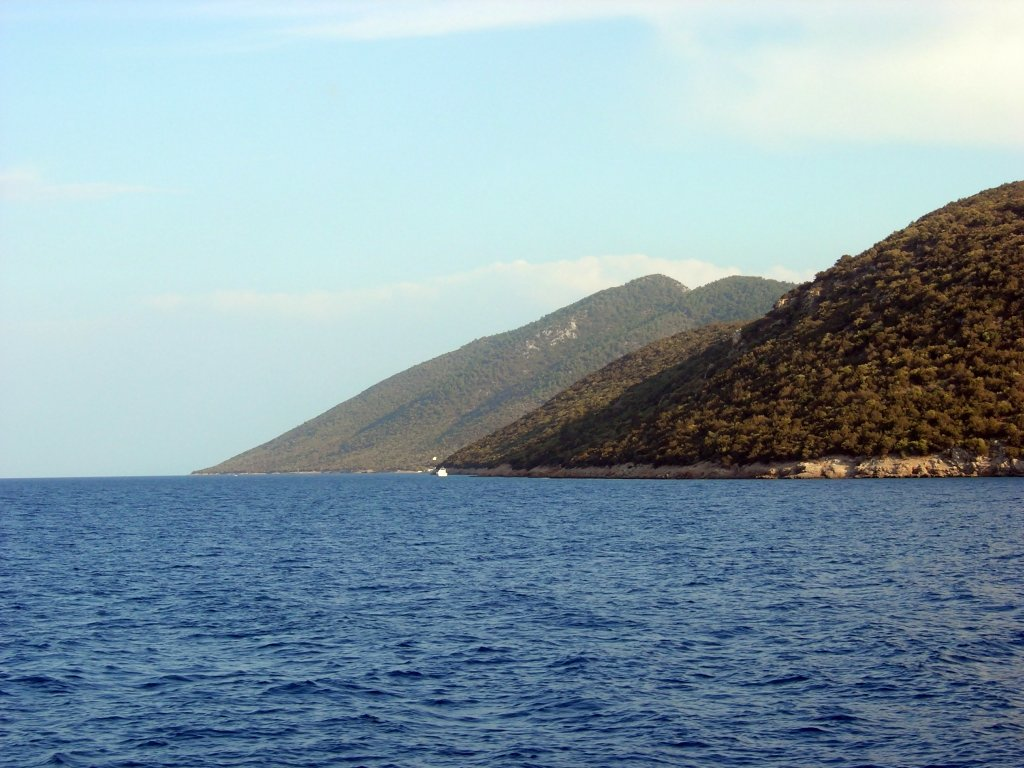
The island seen from West

Kara Ada (literally "Black island" in Turkish) is a small Turkish island at the entrance of the harbor of Bodrum in the Aegean Sea. It is a popular tourist destination, particularly for yachting.

== History ==
The ancient Greeks called it Arkonnesos (Ancient Greek: Ἀρκόνησος). During the Siege of Halicarnassus by Alexander the Great, some of the Persian troops withdrew to the island after they first set fire to the Halicarnassus.

In the Middle Ages the island, which the Greeks know under the name of Arkos, was taken over by the Knights of St. John Hospitaller, who also occupied Bodrum. It was conquered by the Ottoman Empire in the 16th century. In 1919 it was occupied by the Italians together with Bodrum. The 1932 Convention between Italy and Turkey assigned it to Turkey.

== Sources ==
- Bertarelli, L.V. (1929). Guida d'Italia, Vol. XVII (in Italian). Milano: Consociazione Turistica Italiana.
