= Convention between Italy and Turkey (1932) =

1932 treaty between Italy and Turkey

Map of the area of Kastellorizo and the surrounding islets, with the boundary as defined in the Convention.

The Convention between Italy and Turkey settled in 1932 a territorial dispute between Italy and Turkey in the Aegean sea.

== History ==
The Convention, signed in Ankara on January 4, 1932, by the Italian Plenipotentiary, Ambassador Pompeo Aloisi, and the Turkish foreign minister Tevfik Rüştü Aras, settled a dispute that had arisen in the aftermath of the Treaty of Lausanne of 1923, about the sovereignty over a number of small islets and the delimitation of the territorial waters between the coast of Anatolia and the island of Kastellórizo, which had been an Italian possession since 1921.

Through the convention, the islets situated inside the bay of the harbour of Kastellorizo, along with the islands of Rho and Strongili further off, were assigned to Italy, while all other islets in the surrounding area were assigned to Turkey.

The names in italian and Turkish languages in the area around the Bodrum area (of the western Anatolia peninsula) are shown in the following section:

- Border Protocol of 1932; Demarcation line
- Geographical points Turkish side
Point	Name in text	Modern name
A	Mordala I.	
B	Kara Ada	Kara Ada
C	Guirejik I.	Gürecik Adası
D	Utchian I.	Kargı Adası
E	Arkialla Pt.	
F	Hussein Pt.	Hüseyin Burnu
G	Lodo	Yassıada
H	Atsaki	Topan Adası / Zouka
I	Kato I.	Çavuş Adası
J	Pondikusa	Büyükkiremit Adası
K	Sandama Peninsula	İnce Burnu
L	C. Monodendri	Tekeağaç
- Italian (later Greek) side
Point	Name in text	Modern name
A	C. Phuka	Ag. Fokas
B	Luro Pt	Akr. Psalidi
C	Kum Pt.	Akr. Ammoglossa
D	C. Russa	Akr. Roussa
E	Vasiliki Pt.	Vasiliki
F	Karapsili Pt.	Akr. Atsipas
G	Kardak (Rks)	Imia/Kardak
H	Kalolimno	Kalolimnos
I	Agia Kiriaki	Ag. Kiriaki
J	Pharmako	Farmakonisi
- Source: Text of the 1932 treaty and border protocol, and modern maps of the area.

Moreover, the Italian Government recognised the sovereignty of Turkey over the Aegean islet of Kara Ada (Greek: Arcos), situated in front of the town of Bodrum.

In an Appendix signed in December of the same year, the two countries agreed to extend the convention delimiting the sea border between the Anatolian coast and the Italian Dodecanese. This was done by defining thirty five points which were equidistant between Italian and Turkish territory (some are shown in image below).

The validity of the appendix became a political issue in the context of the Aegean dispute in 1996, after the Imia/Kardak crisis. The Turkish government has rejected it as legally invalid, on the grounds that it was not deposited at the League of Nations in Geneva. This, according to the Turkish view, means that the sovereignty over an unknown number of small islets and rocks in the Dodecanese may be still undefined. However, the validity of the convention itself, with respect to Kara Ada and the Kastellórizo region, is not under dispute.

== See also ==
- Italian Islands of the Aegean
