= Psomi =

Islet in Greece

Psomi Ψωμί
- Settlement
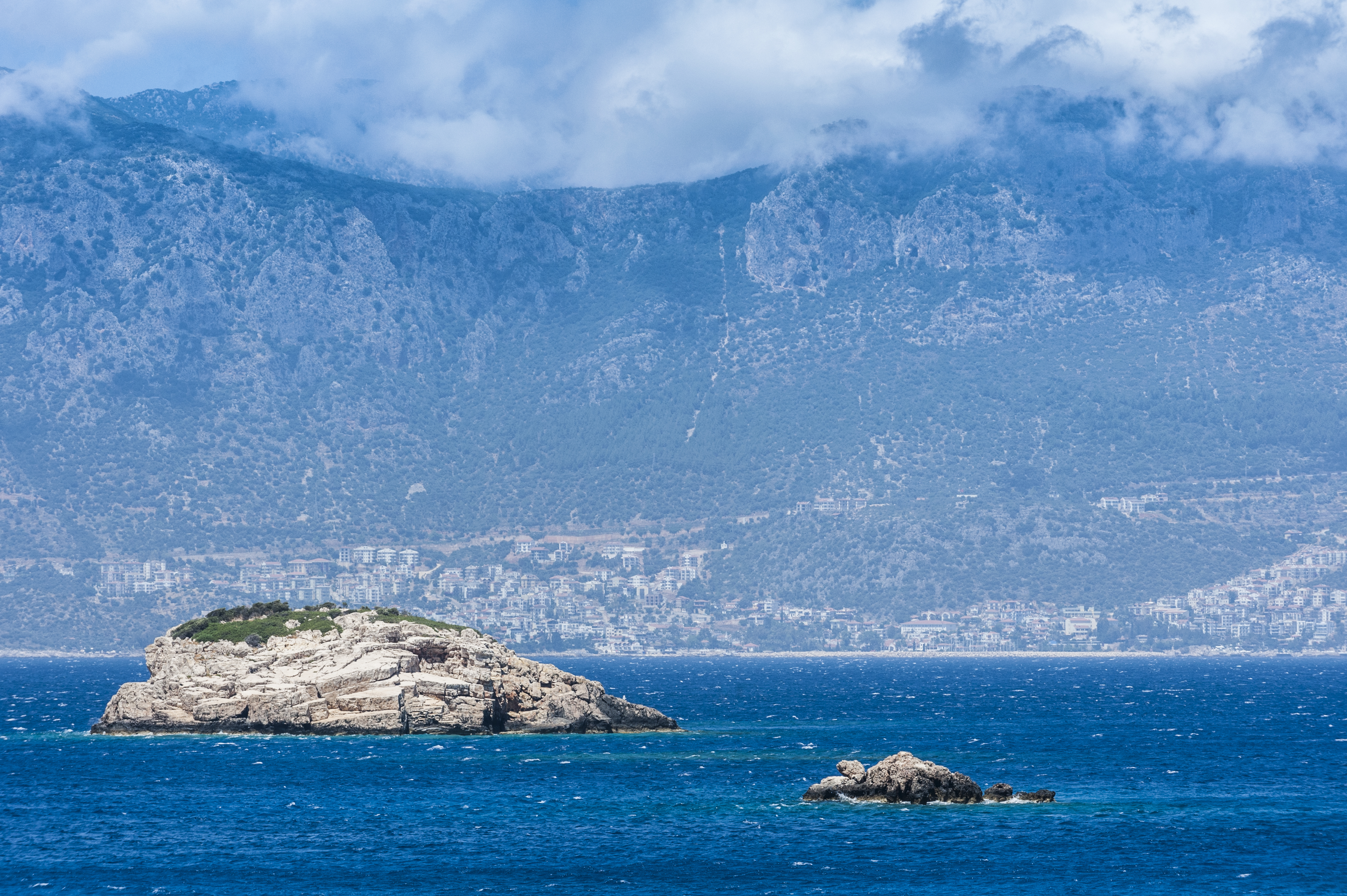

- Location within Greece
- Coordinates: 36°09′14″N 29°36′32″E
- Country: Greece
- Administrative region: South Aegean
- Regional unit: Rhodes
- Municipality: Kastellorizo

Population (2021)
  - Total: 0
- Time zone: UTC+2 (EET)
  - Summer (DST): UTC+3 (EEST)

Psomi (Greek: Ψωμί) is a Greek islet close to the island of Kastellorizo. It is part of the municipality of Kastellorizo. Its area is 0.0035 km^{2}, and according to the 2021 Greek population census, it didn't have any residents.

== Fauna ==
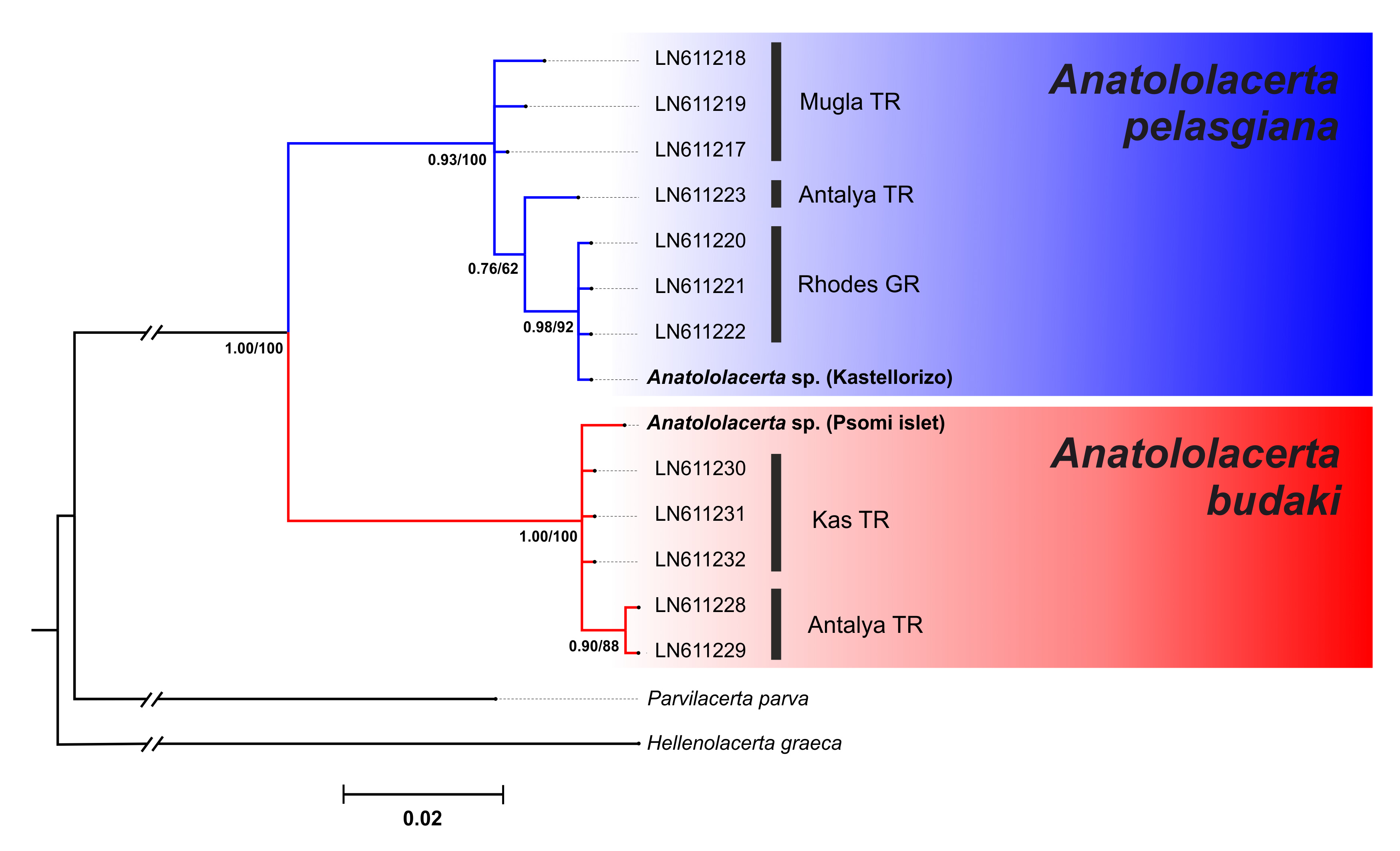
subspecies of Anatololacerta finikensis in Turkey and Greece

Psomi is the only place in Greece where the lizard Anatololacerta finikensis has been found. Kotschy's gecko was also discovered in the island.
