= Grotten =

Building in Oslo, Norway

Coordinates: 59°55′6.81″N 10°43′52.12″E

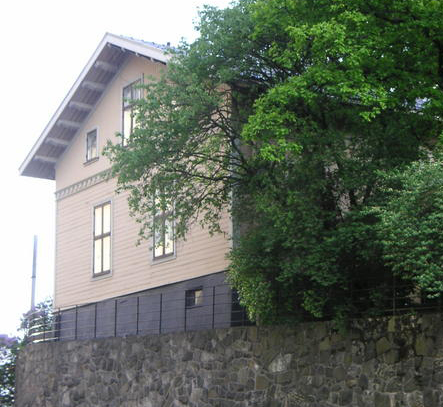
Grotten in Norway

Grotten (Norwegian, 'The Grotto') is a nineteenth-century building (1823) located on the premises of the Royal Palace in the city centre of Oslo, Norway. Grotten is an honorary residence owned by the Norwegian state.

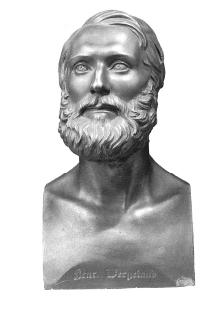
Henrik Wergeland

== History ==
The house is situated over a grotto on a rocky outcrop at the edge of Palace Park (Slottsparken). The house was designed by architect Hans Linstow. It was originally the home of the poet Henrik Wergeland who lived there from 1841 to 1845. Since the 1920s, it has been awarded as a permanent residence to a person specifically bestowed this honour by the King of Norway. Residents at Grotten have included composer Christian Sinding, writer Arnulf Øverland, composer Arne Nordheim and playwright Jon Fosse.
