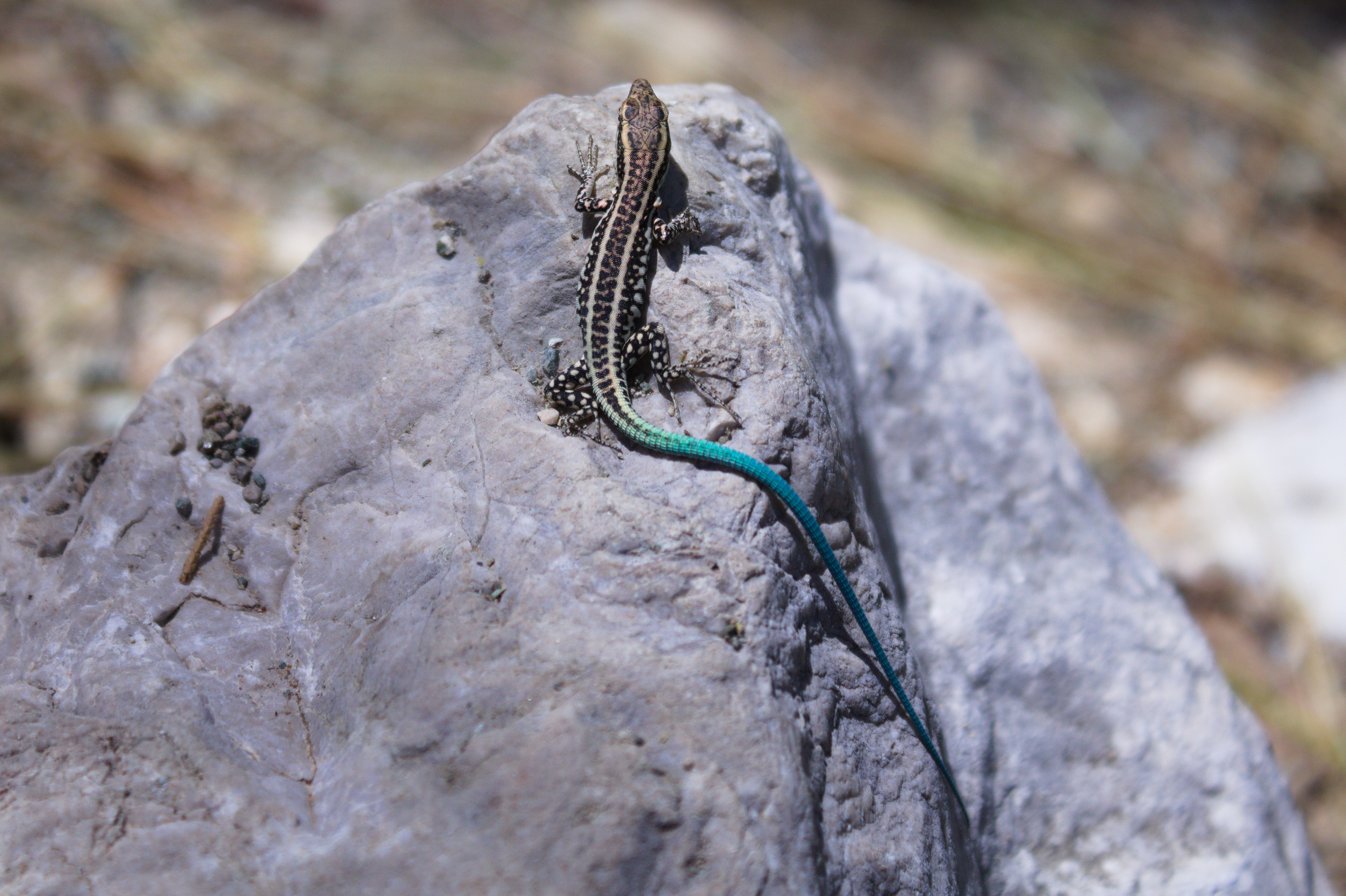

Scientific classification
- Domain: Eukaryota
- Kingdom: Animalia
- Phylum: Chordata
- Class: Reptilia
- Order: Squamata
- Family: Lacertidae
- Genus: Anatololacerta
- Species: A. finikensis

Binomial name
- Anatololacerta finikensis (Eiselt & Schmidtler, 1987)

= Anatololacerta finikensis =

Species of lizard

Anatololacerta finikensis is a species of lizard endemic to Turkey. It has also been found in Greece, on the island of Psomi.
