= The Grotto (San Antonio) =

Concrete sculpture in San Antonio, Texas, U.S.

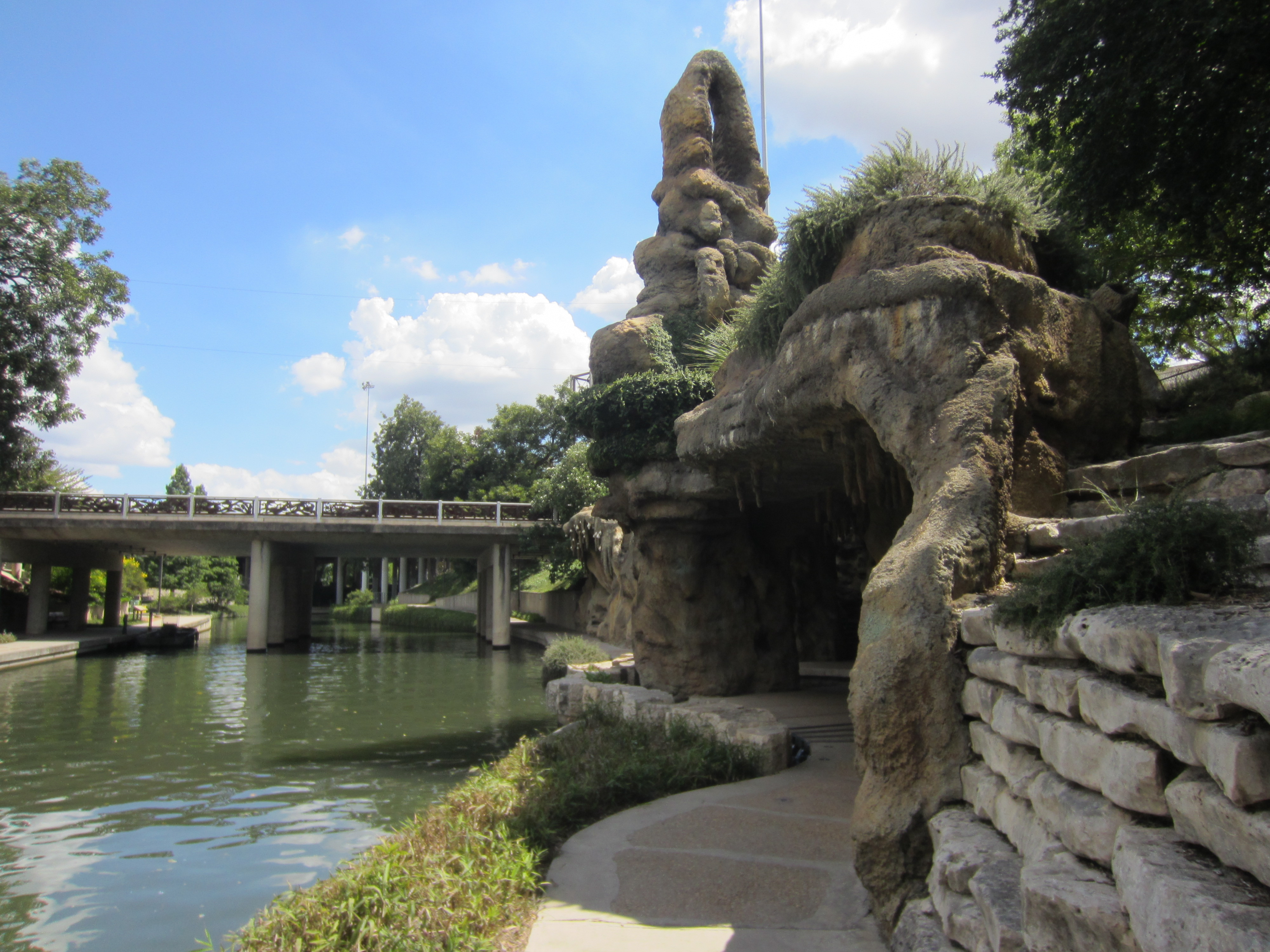
- Exterior of The Grotto, 2018
- Artist: Carlos Cortés
- Medium: Concrete
- 29°26′26″N 98°28′57″W

The Grotto is a concrete sculpture by Carlos Cortés, along the San Antonio River in San Antonio, Texas, United States. In 2020, some pieces intended to be added to The Grotto were stolen.

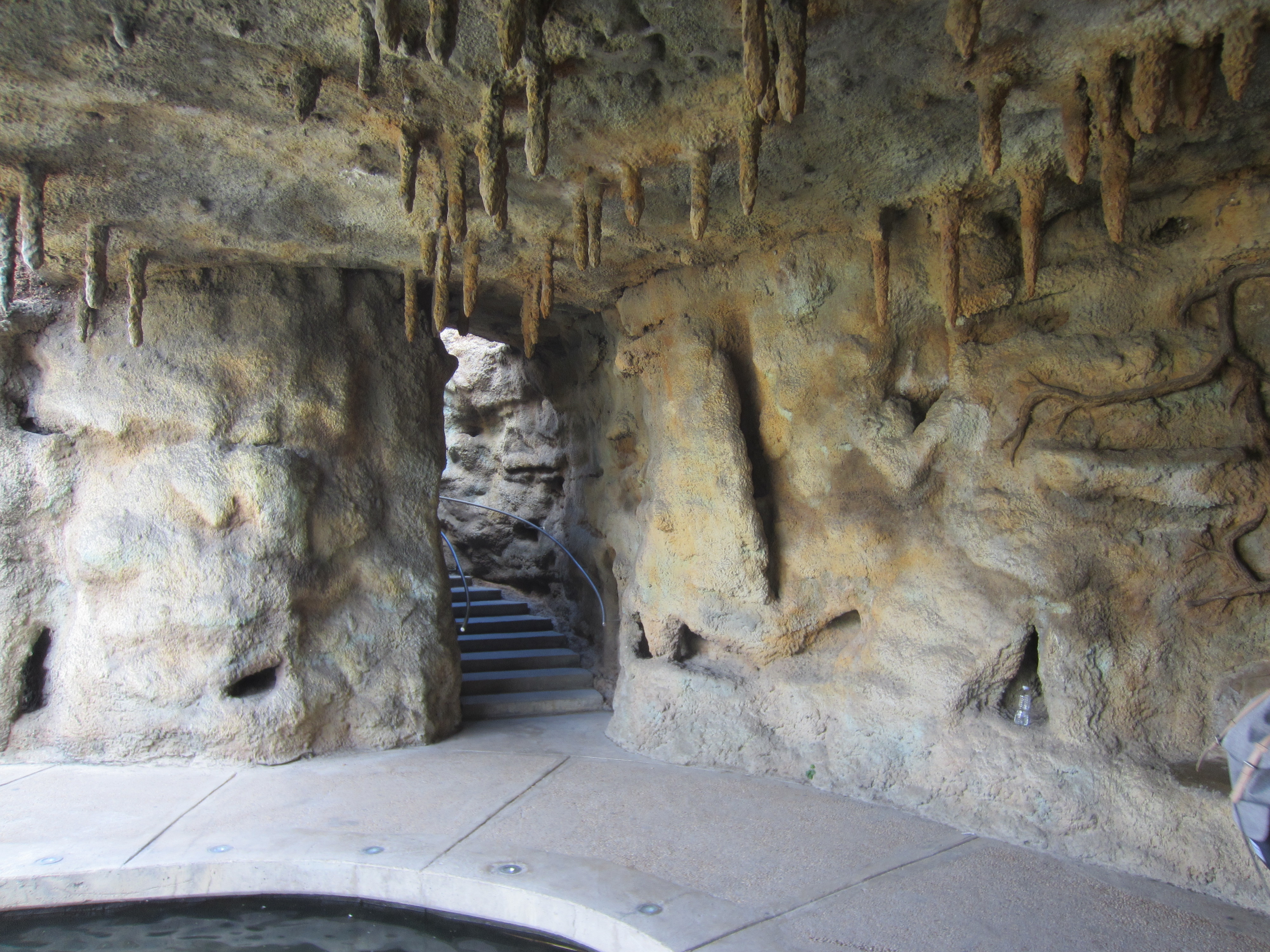
Interior, 2018
