= Grotte =

Grotte may refer to:

- Grotte, Sicily, a comune in the province of Agrigento, Italy
- Grotte di Castro, a comune in the Province of Viterbo in the Italian region Latium
- Robert Grotte (1913–1964), New Zealand professional rugby league footballer
- Nicolas de La Grotte (1530–c. 1600), French composer and keyboard player of the Renaissance

== See also ==
- Grotto (French: Grotte), a natural or artificial cave
- Grottasöngr, an Old Norse poem
- Grotta (disambiguation)
