= Grotto (Satanism) =

Clandestine association or gathering of Satanists

Within the Church of Satan, a Grotto (from Italian grotta, a type of cave) is a clandestine association or gathering of Satanists within geographical proximity for means of social, ritual, and special interest activities. The Black House, the founding place and headquarters of the Church of Satan from 1966 to 1997, was effectively the first grotto, and was for a time referred to as the "Central Grotto". Grottos existed for a time in various parts of the United States; these included the Babylon Grotto in Detroit, the Stygian Grotto in Dayton, and the Lilith Grotto in New York. In 1975, LaVey disbanded all grottos, then reinstated them in the 1980s. The Church of Satan no longer formally recognizes or charters grottos.

== See also ==
- Cell group – Form of church organization
- Coven – Group or gathering of witches
