= Blue Grotto =

Blue Grotto may refer to:

- Blue Grotto (Biševo), a cave on the Croatian island of Biševo
- Blue Grotto (Capri), a cave on the Italian island of Capri
- Blue Grotto (Malta), a cave in Malta
- Blue Grotto (Brooklyn Bridge), a storage space

== See also ==
- Blue Cave (disambiguation)
