= Blue Cave (Kastellorizo) =

Cave in Greece

Coordinates: 36°7′24.48″N 29°34′25.62″E

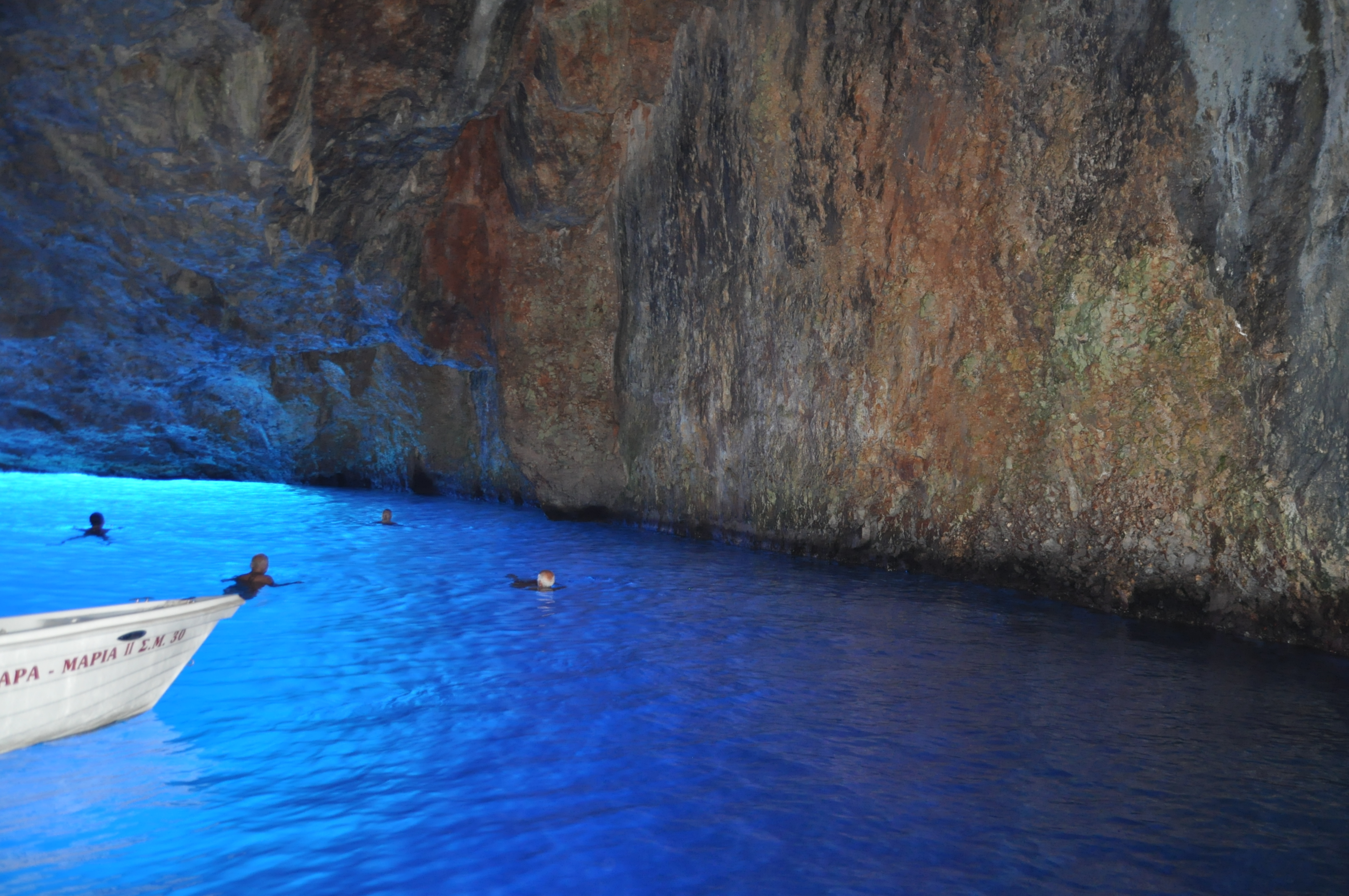
The blue cave

Blue Cave (Greek: Γαλάζια Σπηλιά) is the most celebrated attraction of the Greek island of Kastellorizo. The cave lies on the southeast coast of the island, and is named by the inhabitants Phókiali (Φώκιαλη, Greek for seal's refuge).

At 40–50 m long, 25–30 m wide, and 20–25 m high, it is much larger than the world famous Grotta Azzurra on Capri, Italy.

The light of the sun, refracted through the sea, is reflected in the interior of the grotto, thereby producing a dazzling blue colour. The cave can be visited only by boat and, since the entrance is barely one metre high above sea level, only under calm sea conditions. The best time of the day to visit is early in the morning, when the sun is still low.

== Sources ==
- Bertarelli, L.V. (1929). Guida d'Italia, Vol. XVII. Consociazione Turistica Italiana, Milano.
