= Strongyli Megistis =

Island in Greece

Strongyli Megistis Στρογγυλή Μεγίστης
- Settlement
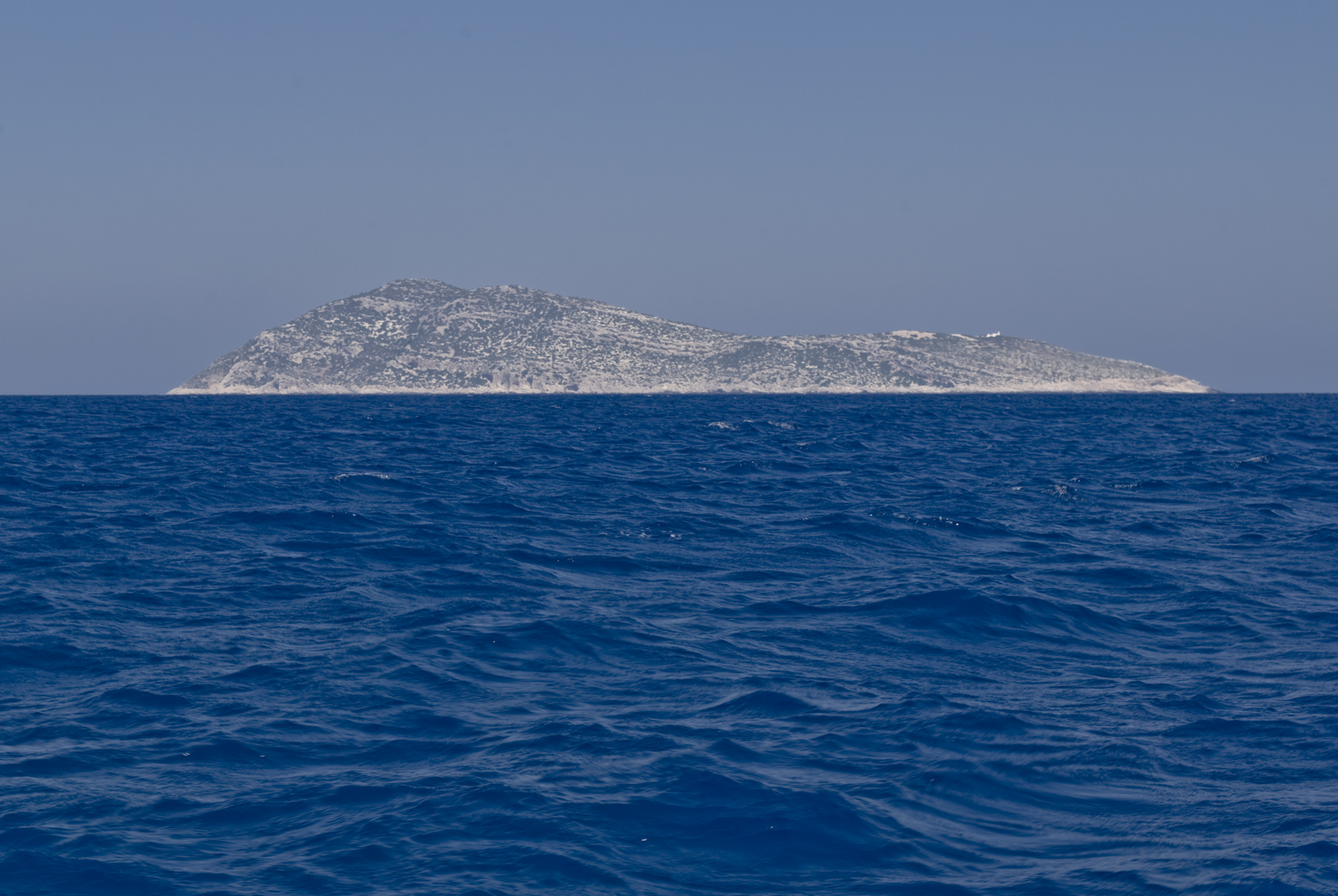
- The islet of Strongyli seen from southwest

- Location within Greece
- Coordinates: 36°06′50″N 29°38′12″E
- Country: Greece
- Administrative region: South Aegean
- Regional unit: Rhodes
- Municipality: Kastellorizo

Area
  - Total: 0.9 km^{2} (0.35 sq mi)

Population (2021)
  - Total: 1
  - Density: 1.1/km^{2} (2.9/sq mi)
- Time zone: UTC+2 (EET)
  - Summer (DST): UTC+3 (EEST)
- Postal code: 851 11
- Area code: 22460
- Vehicle registration: ΚΧ, ΡΟ, ΡΚ

Strongyli Megistis (Greek: Στρογγυλή Μεγίστης), also called simply Strongyli or Ypsili, is a Greek islet which lies in the eastern Mediterranean Sea, about four kilometers south-east of the island of Kastellorizo. The island is about 1.5 kilometres (0.9 miles) long, and up to 700 metres (2,300 ft) wide. It covers an area of about 0.9 square kilometres (0.3 sq mi). It is rather flat and covered with macchia.

Strongyli is the easternmost Greek territory. Administratively, it is part of the Municipality of Megisti. According to the 2021 census, the island has 1 inhabitant. It has a lighthouse, which has the characteristic of being the easternmost building in Greece. There is also a cargo aerial cableway which is used by the army to transport cargo from the area of disembarkation to the Surveillance Outpost of Stroghyli.

The islet is named Çam Adası ("Pine Island") or Fener Adası ("Lighthouse Island") in Turkish.

== See also ==
- List of islands of Greece
