= Rhodes (city) =

Rhodes Ρόδος
- Municipal unit
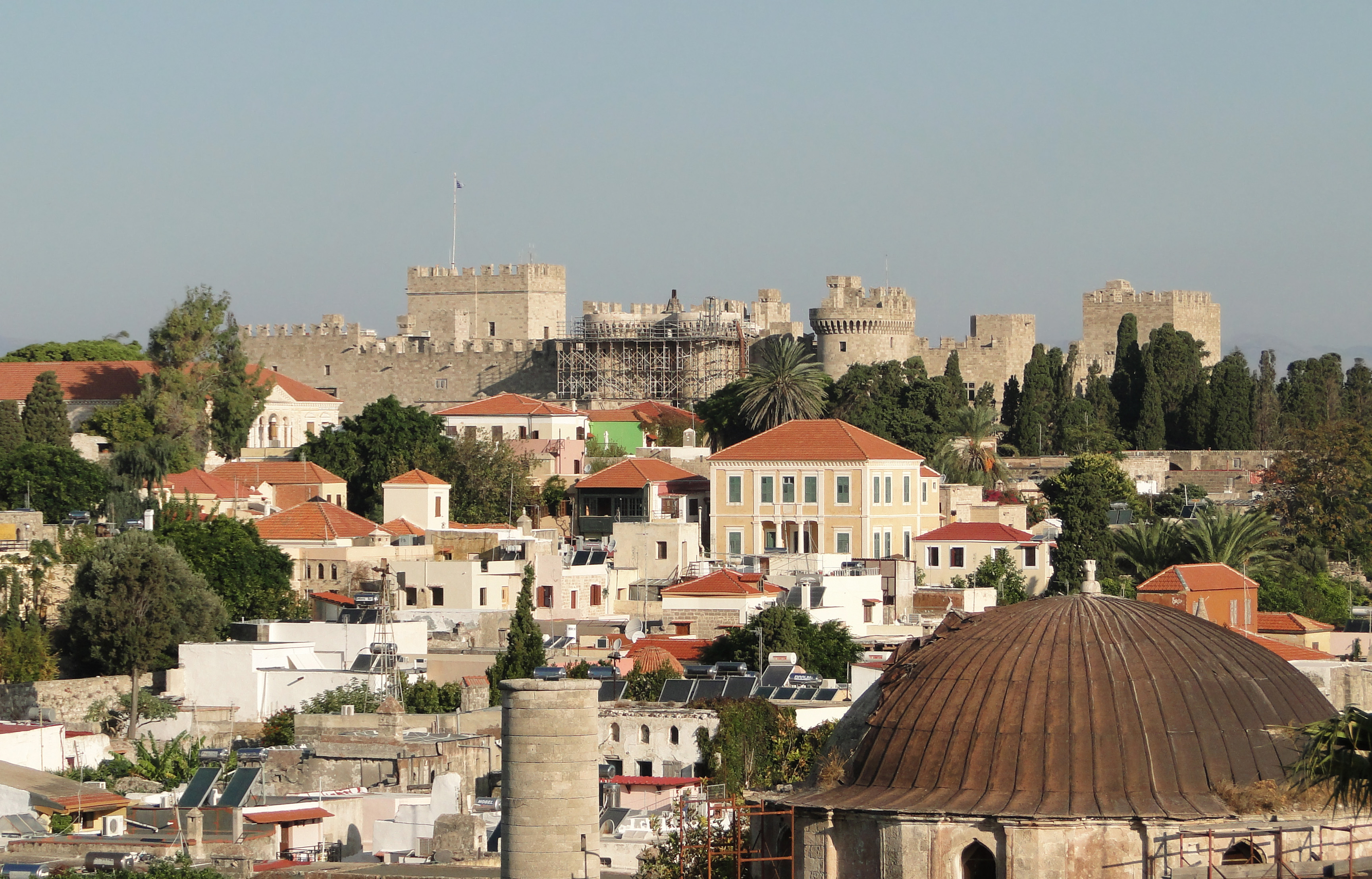
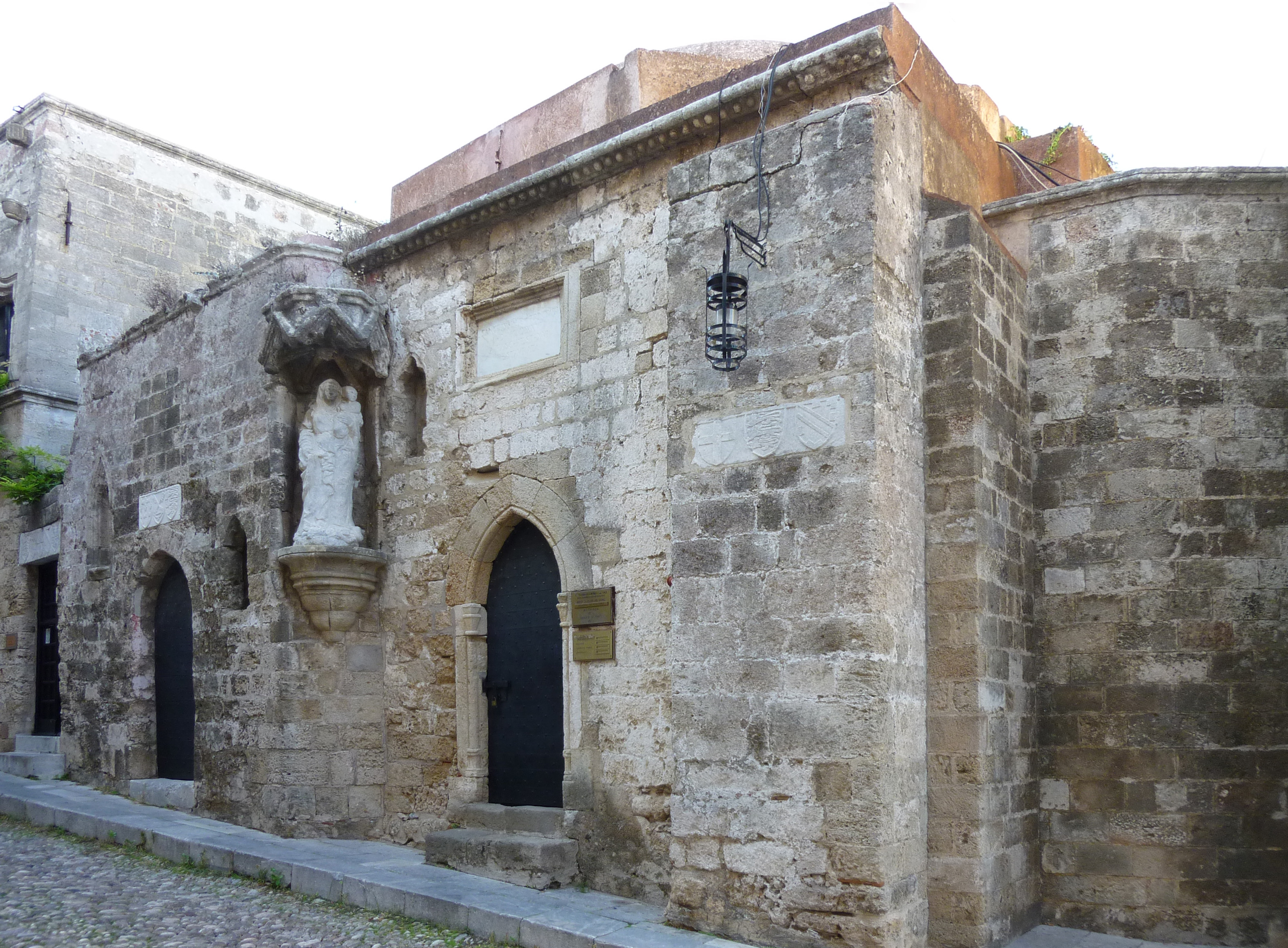
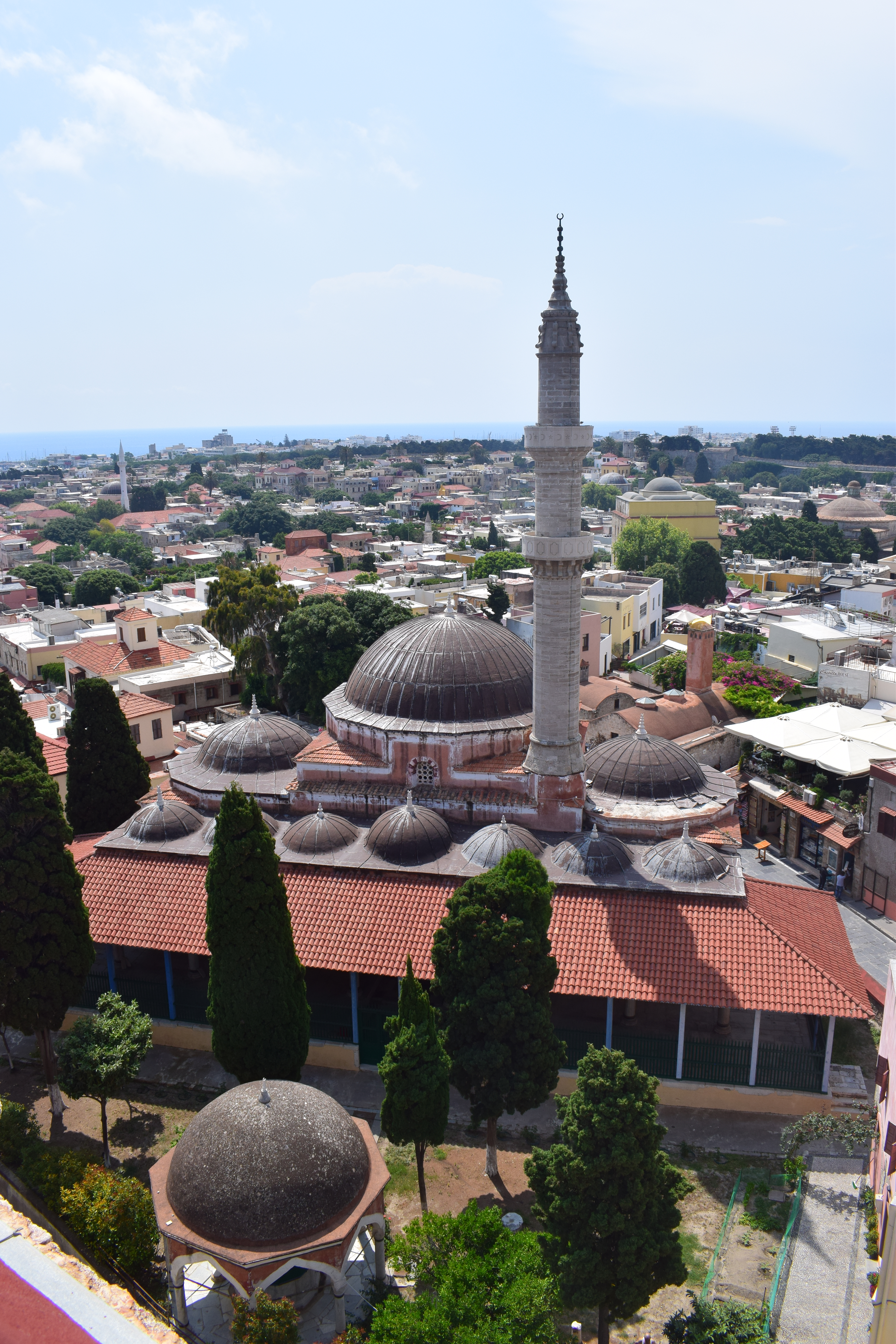
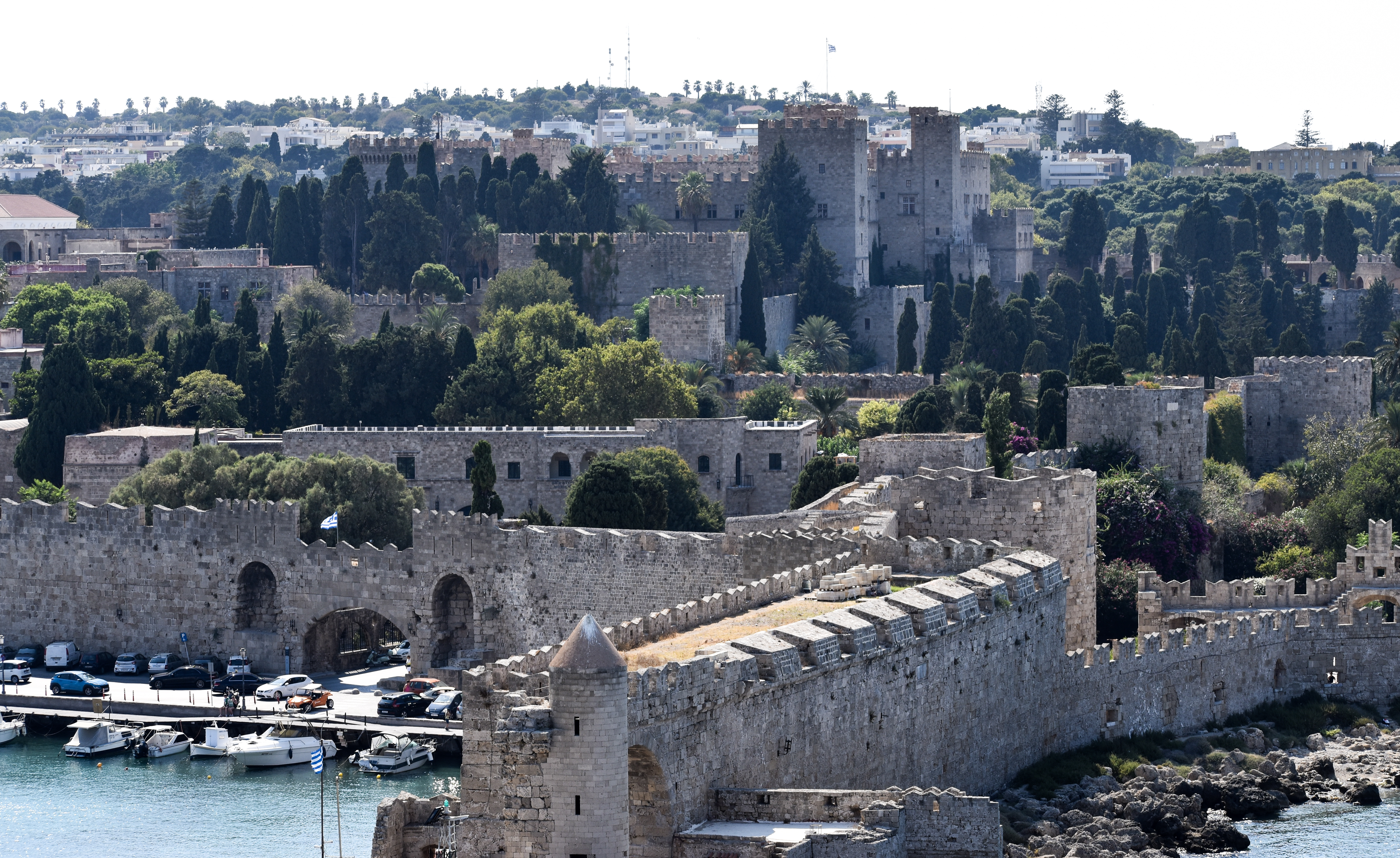
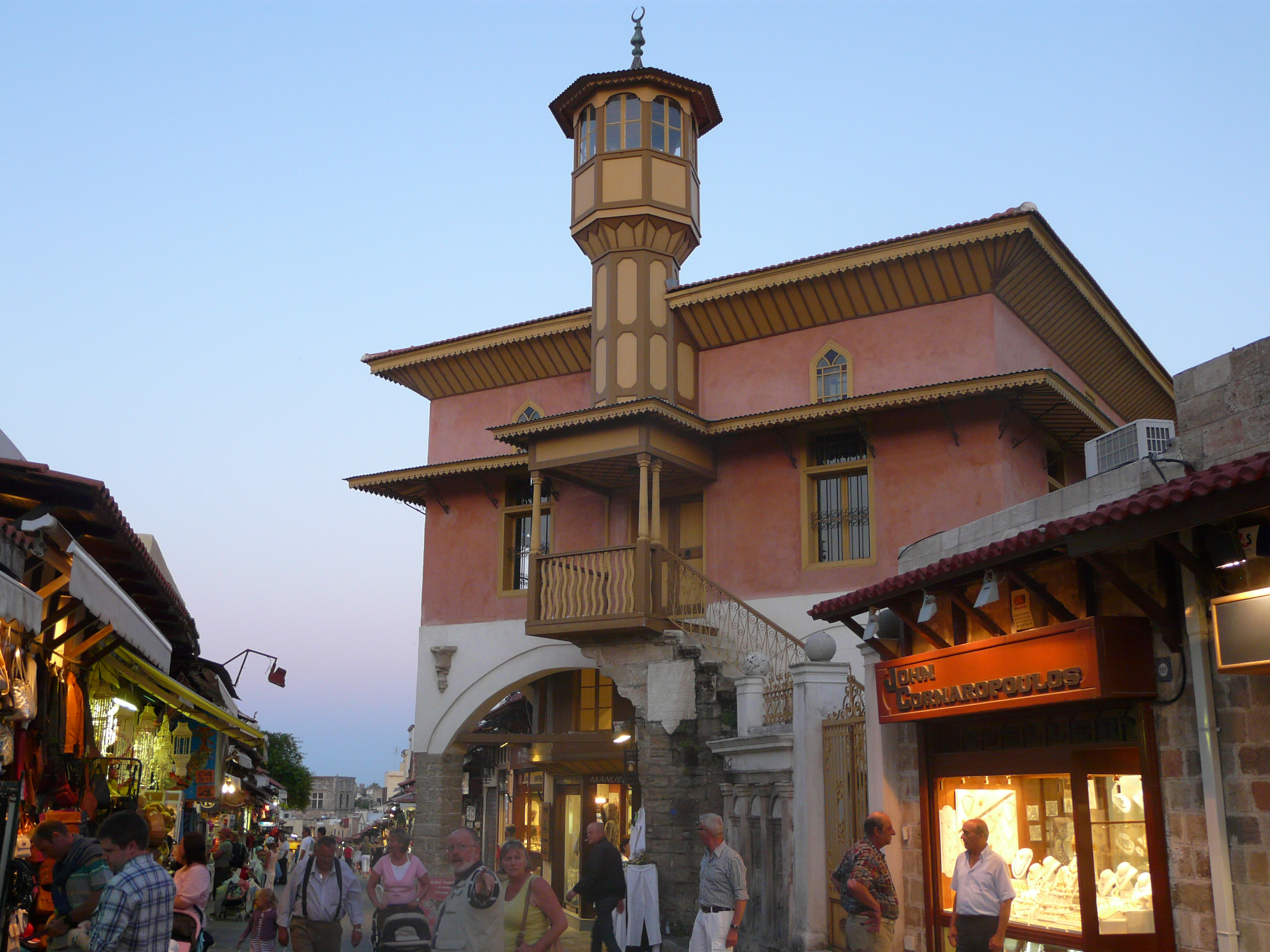
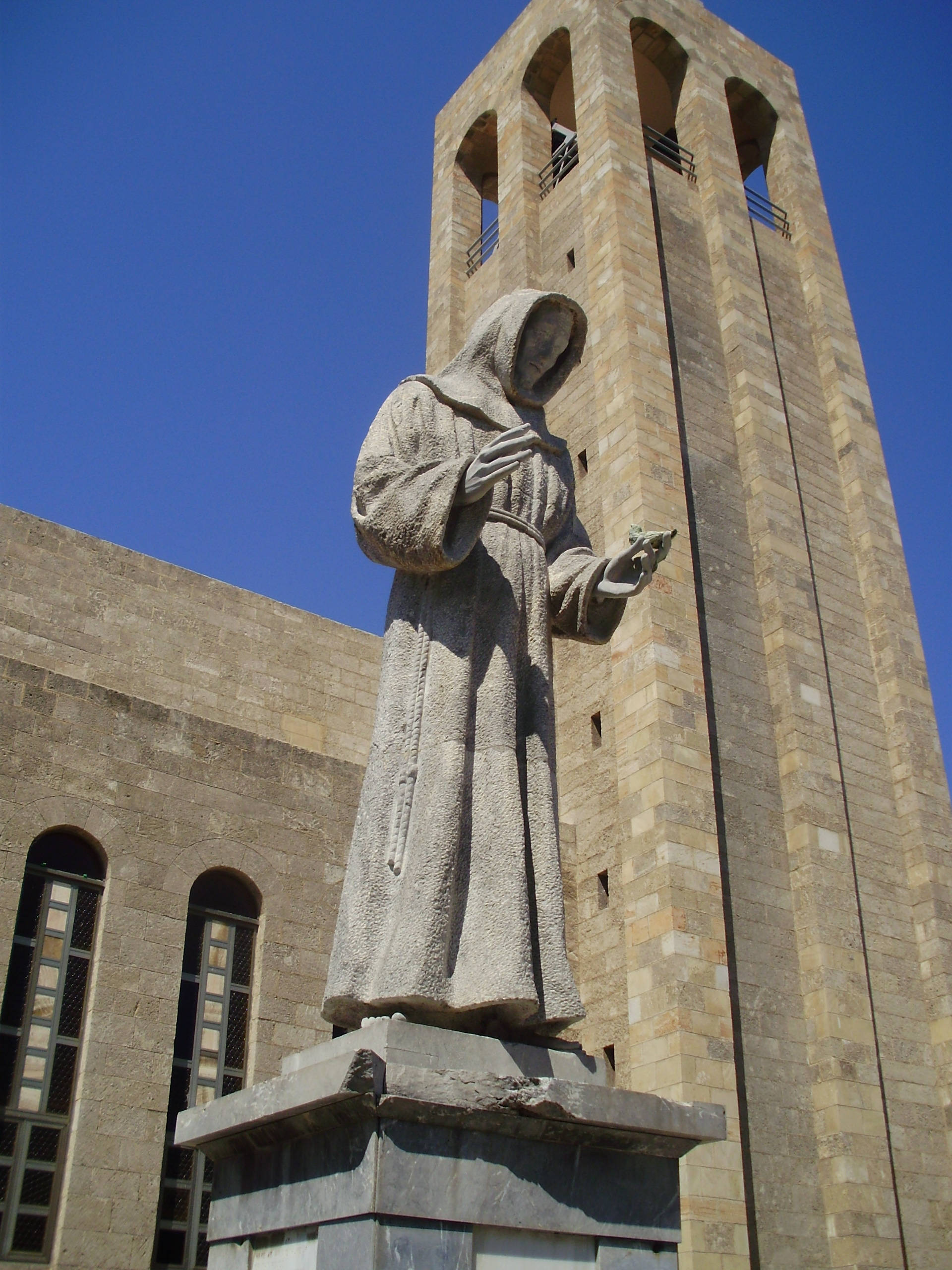
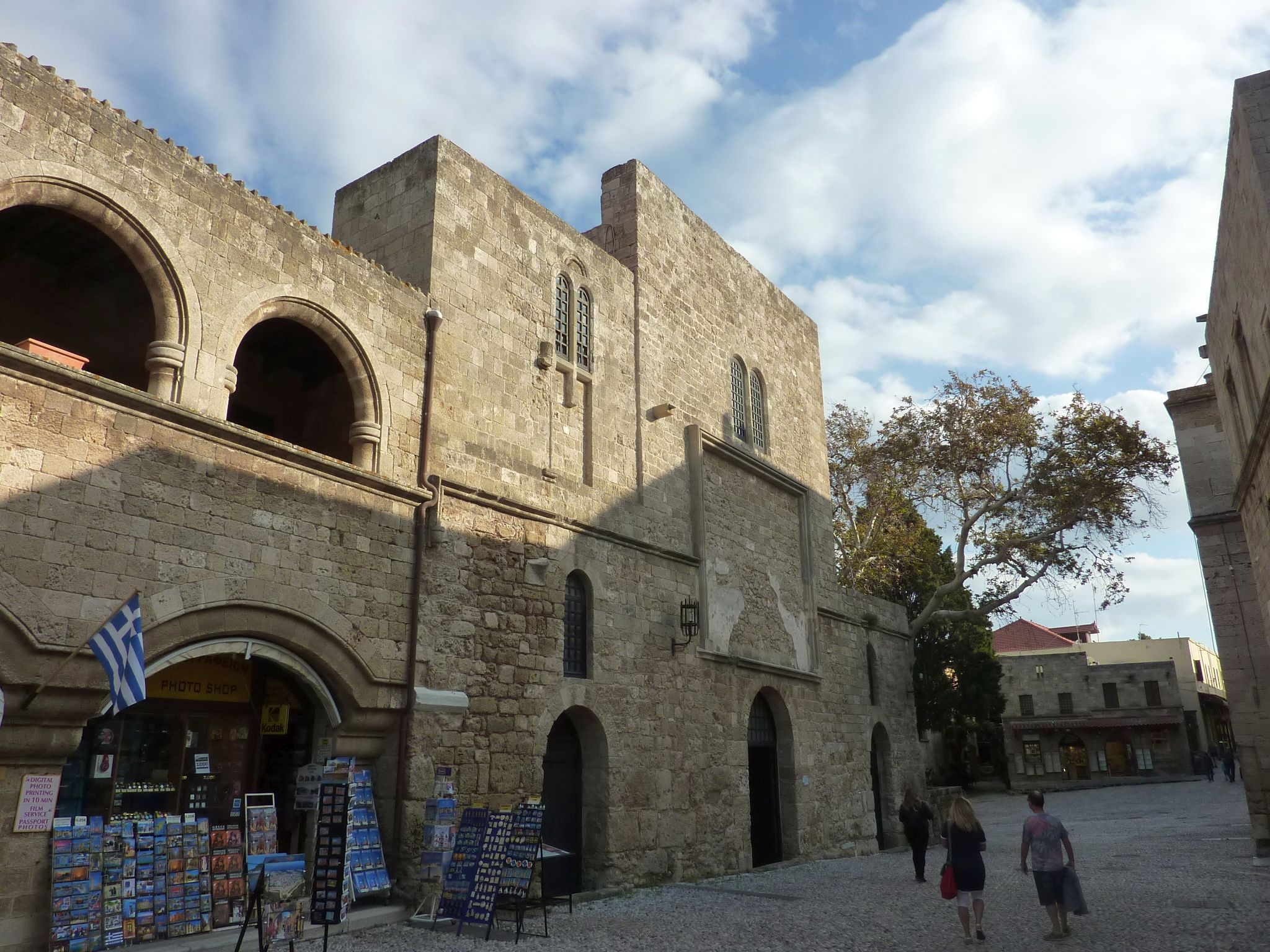
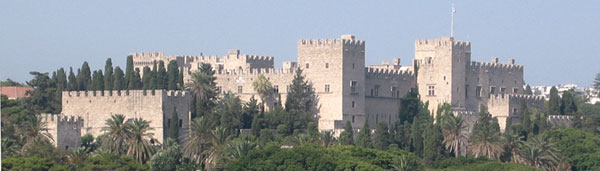
- View of Rhodes Holy Trinity Church Suleymaniye Mosque Fortifications of Rhodes Mehmet Agha Mosque St. Francis of Assisi Cathedral Panagia tou Kastrou Palace of the Grand Master of the Knights of Rhodes

- Flag

- Location within Rhodes

- Location within Greece
- Coordinates: 36°26′N 28°13′E
- Country: Greece
- Administrative region: South Aegean
- Regional unit: Rhodes
- Municipality: Rhodes

Area
  - Municipal unit: 19.481 km^{2} (7.522 sq mi)
- Elevation: 26 m (85 ft)

Population (2021)
  - Metro: 86,199
  - Municipal unit: 56,440
  - Municipal unit density: 2,897/km^{2} (7,504/sq mi)
- Demonym(s): Rhodian, Rhodiot or Rhodiote (rare); Rhoditis (Greek)
- Time zone: UTC+2 (EET)
  - Summer (DST): UTC+3 (EEST)
- Postal code: 851 00, 31, 32, 33
- Area code: 2241
- Vehicle registration: PO, PK, PY
- Website: www.rhodes.gr

Rhodes (/roʊdz/; Greek: Ρόδος, Ródos [ˈroðos]) is the principal city and a former municipality on the island of Rhodes in the Dodecanese, Greece. Since the 2011 local government reform, it is part of the municipality Rhodes, of which it is the seat and a municipal unit. It has a population of approximately 56,000 with nearly 90,000 in its metropolitan area. Rhodes has been famous since antiquity as the site of Colossus of Rhodes, one of the Seven Wonders of the Ancient World. The citadel of Rhodes, built by the Hospitallers, is one of the best-preserved medieval towns in Europe. The Medieval city is designated as a UNESCO World Heritage Site.

Today, the city of Rhodes is an important Greek urban center and popular international tourist destination.

== History ==
The island of Rhodes is at a crossroads between Europe, the Middle East, and Africa. This has given the city and the island many different identities, cultures, architectures, and languages over its long history. Its position in major sea routes has given Rhodes a very rich history. The island has been inhabited since about 4000 BC (Neolithic Period).

The first modern histories of the city and island in English were written by Cecil Torr in 1885 and 1887.

=== Classical period ===
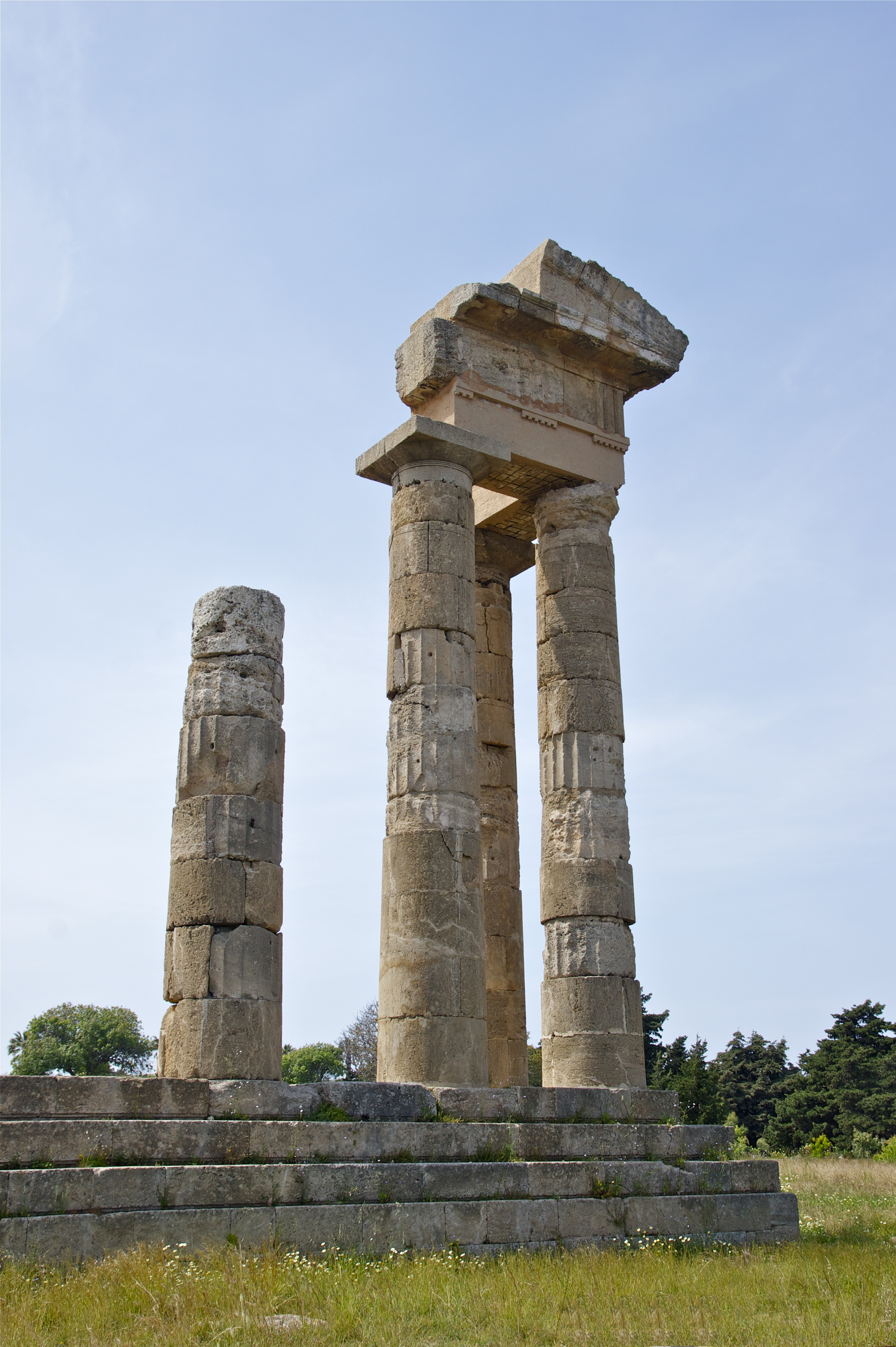
Apollo Temple at the Acropolis of Rhodes.

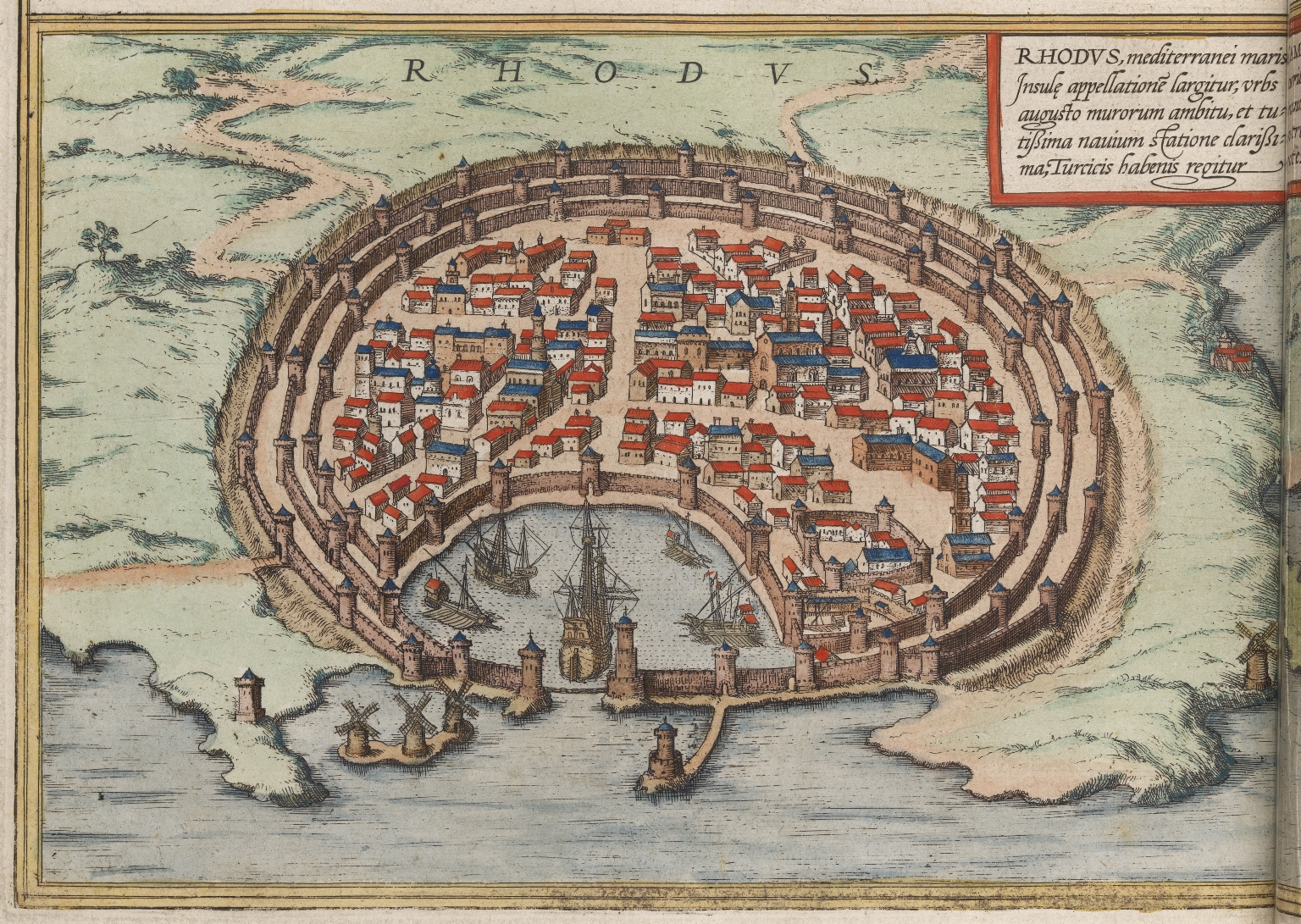
Depiction of Rhodus (Rhodes Town) and its distinctive three-layered defensive walls. Site of the 30 metre high Colossus of Rhodes, which was destroyed in an earthquake in 226 BC.

The city of Rhodes was formed by the cities of Ialyssos, Kamiros and Lindos in 408 BC, and prospered for three centuries during its Golden Age, when sea trade, skilled shipbuilders, and open-minded politicians of the city kept it prosperous until Roman times. The Colossus of Rhodes, one of the original Seven Wonders of the Ancient World was built by Chares of Lindos between 304 and 293 BC, which took 12 years and was completed in 282 BC. The statue represented their sun god Helios, and is believed to have stood near the harbour entrance. The ancient city had a well-constructed sewage system as well as a water supply network as designed by Hippodamus. A strong earthquake hit Rhodes about 226 BC, badly damaging the city and toppling the Colossus.

=== Roman period ===
In 164 BC, Rhodes came under Roman control. It was able to keep its beauty and develop into a leading center of learning for arts and science. The Romans took from the Rhodians their maritime law and applied it to their shipping. Many traces of the Roman period still exist throughout the city and give an insight into the level of civilization at the time. According to Acts 21:1, the Apostle Paul stopped at Rhodes near the end of his third missionary journey.

=== Byzantine period ===
In medieval times, Rhodes was an important Byzantine trading post, as also a crossroads for ships sailing between Constantinople and Alexandria. In the early years of the divided Roman Empire, the Isaurians, a mountain tribe from Cilicia, invaded the island and burned the city. In the 7th century AD it was captured by the Arabs. The latter were the ones who removed the scattered pieces of the Colossus from the port and moved them to Syria where they destroyed them to make coins. After the fall of the Byzantine Empire to the Fourth Crusade in 1204, the native noble Leo Gabalas took control of the island, but after his death and succession by his brother John, the island was briefly occupied by the Genoese before being returned to the Emperor of Nicaea, though ushering in a new, but short-lived, Byzantine period.

=== Knights' period ===
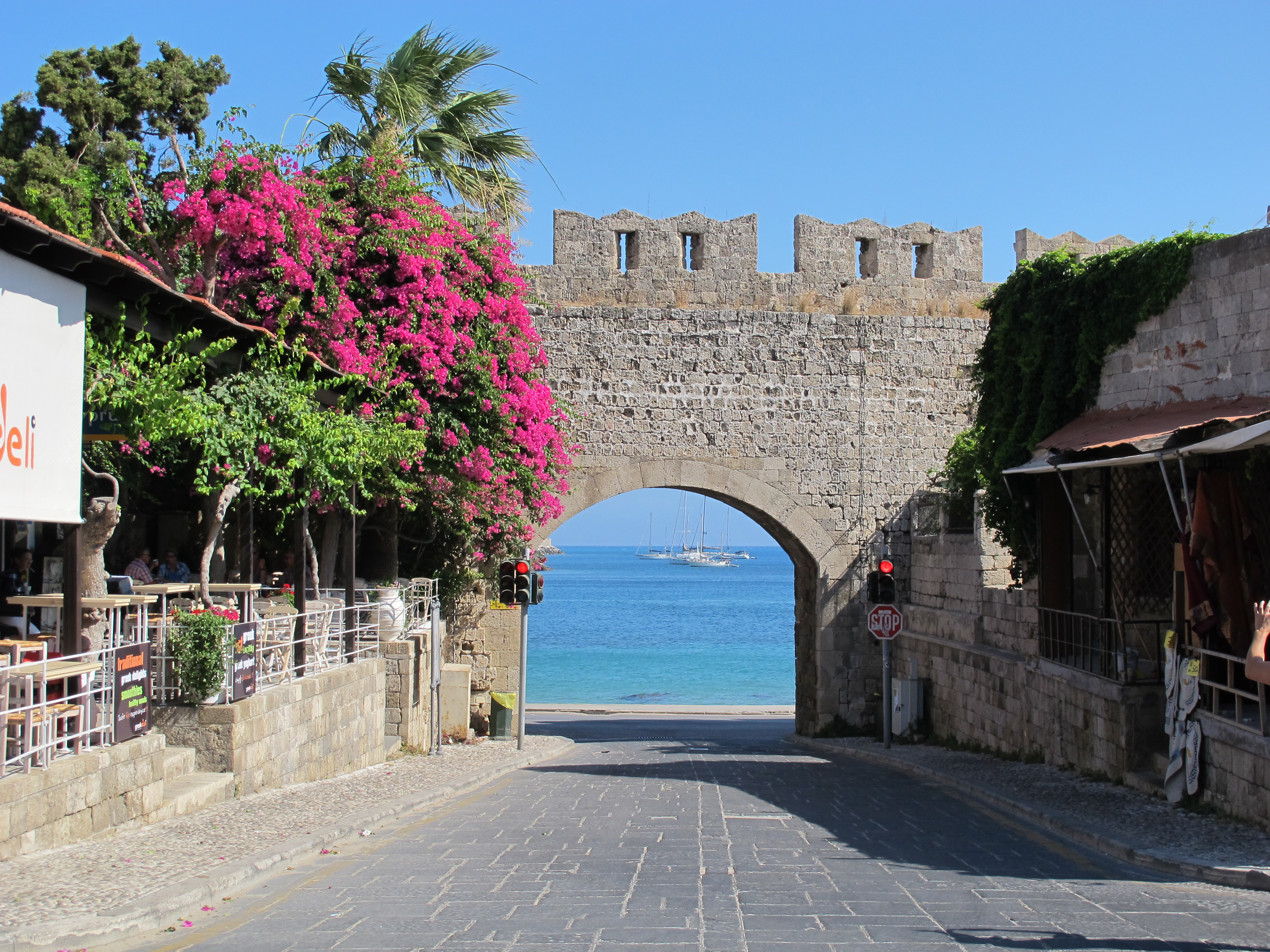
Gate of the Virgin, part of the Fortifications of Rhodes.

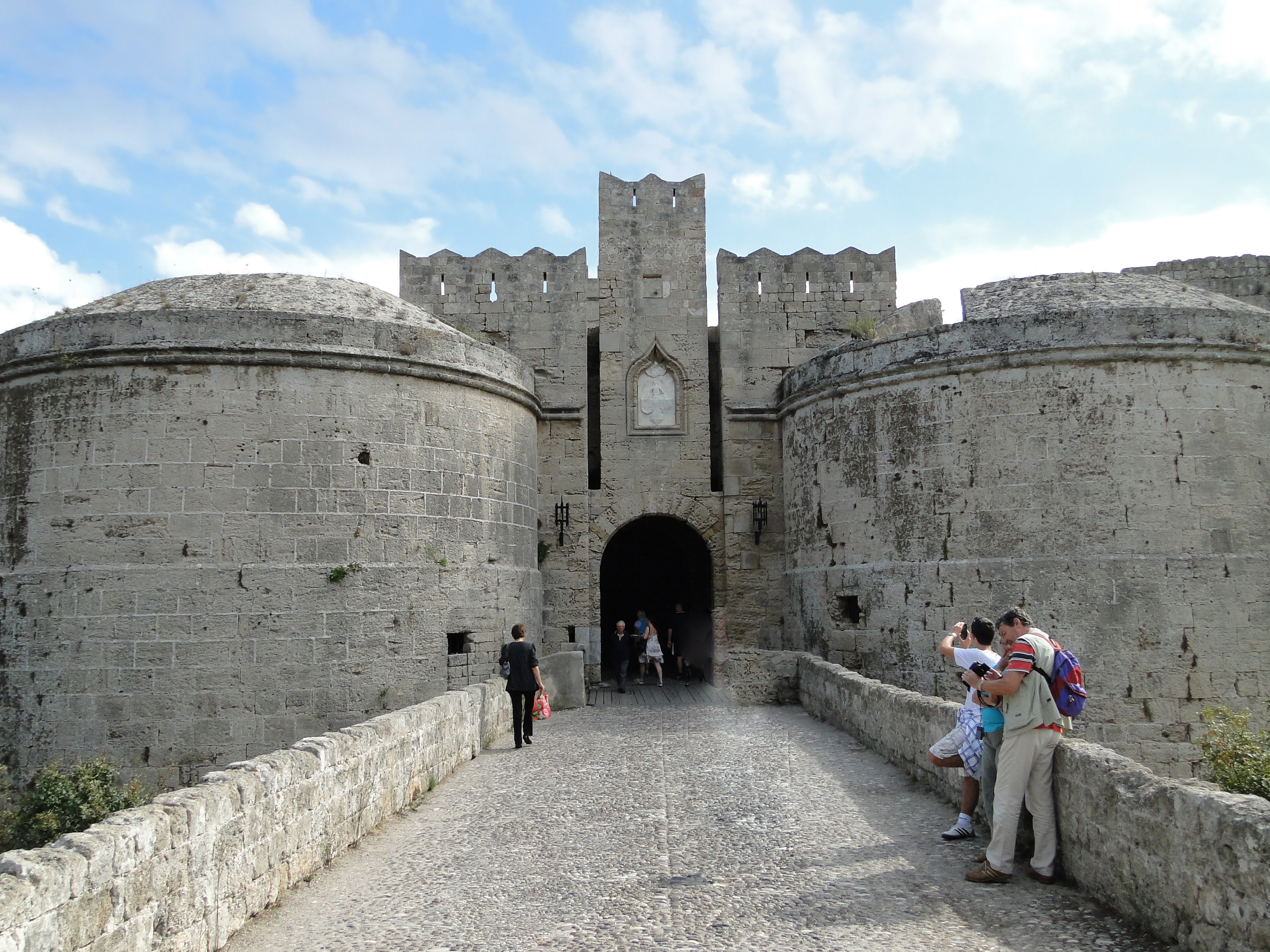
Gate d'Amboise to the medieval city.

The Knights Hospitallers captured and established their headquarters on Rhodes when they left Cyprus after the persecution of the Knights Templar in 1307. Pope Clement V confirmed the Hospitallers possession of the island in 1309. The Knights remained on the island for the next two centuries.

In 1444, the Mamluk fleet led by Aynal Gecut laid siege to Rhodes, but the Knights, aided by the Burgundian naval commander Geoffroy de Thoisy, beat off the Muslim attack.

After the Fall of Constantinople in 1453, the Ottoman Empire began a rapid expansion, and in 1480 Sultan Fatih sent an invasion force to Rhodes commanded by Mesih Pasha. In this first Ottoman Siege of Rhodes, the defenders repelled Turkish attacks from both landward and seaward sides and the invaders left the island in defeat. The defeat halted a concurrent invasion of the Italian peninsula by Ottoman forces and prevented possible Muslim incursion and control of Western Europe.

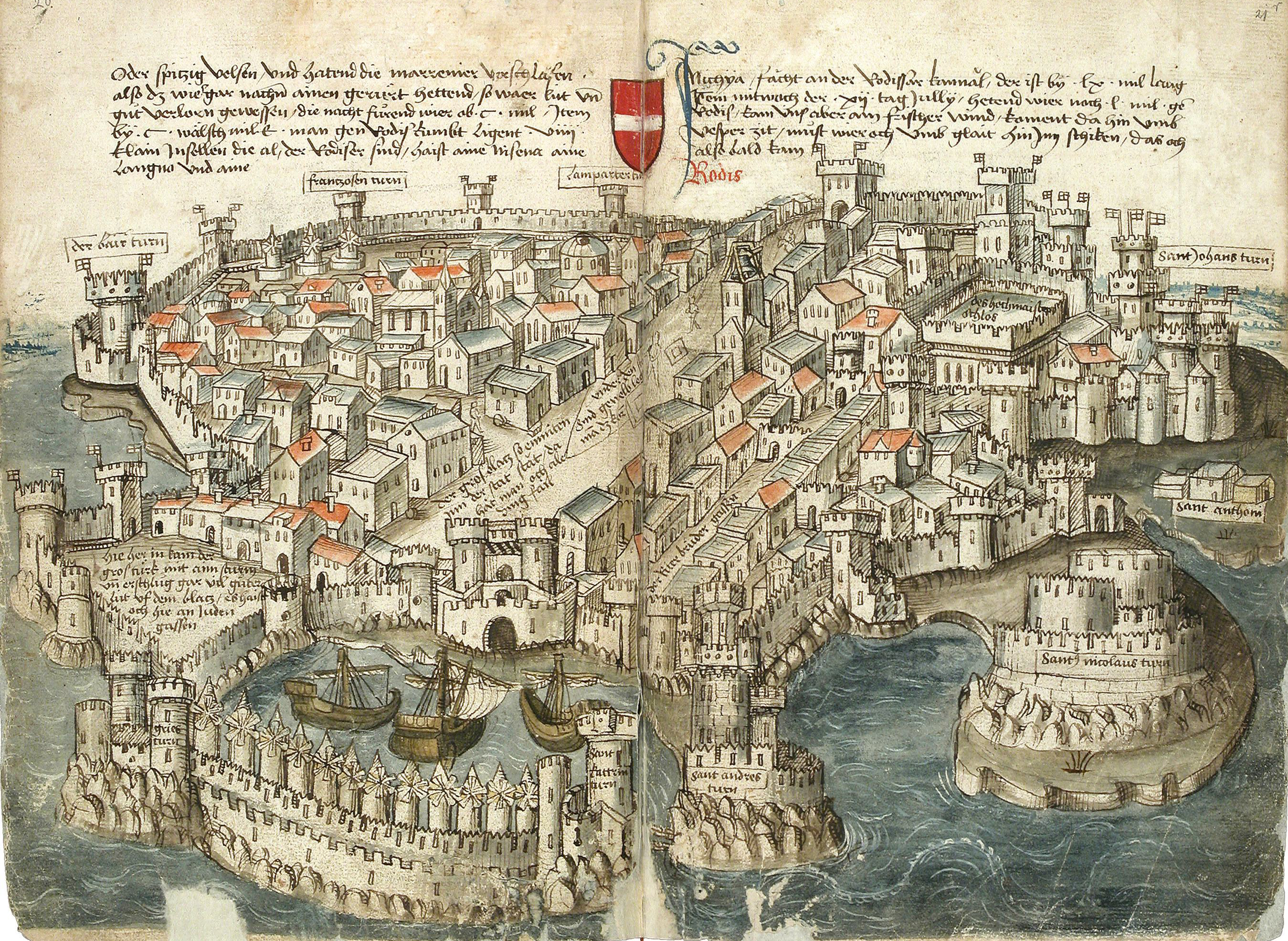
Rhodes city, around 1490.

After the Ottoman defeat in 1480, the Knights Grand Master, Pierre d'Aubusson, oversaw the strengthening of the cities over the next few decades. By the time of his death in 1521, Rhodes possessed among the strongest fortifications of any Christian bastion in the world, including underground passages to the moat that could have quickly been blown up in case of withdrawal. The Knights continued naval attacks launched from Rhodes on Muslim merchants until 1522, when the newly enthroned Sultan Suleiman the Magnificent led a second Ottoman Siege of Rhodes in 1522.

The vastly outnumbered Knights made a spirited defense of the city and inflicted heavy casualties upon the Ottoman besiegers. In December 1522, the Knights and Suleiman came to terms and the Knights were allowed to leave the city with all the wealth they could carry, and in return there would be no retribution upon the inhabitants of the city and they would be allowed to continue to freely practice Christianity. On January 1, 1523 the Knights departed from the island, leaving it to Ottoman control.

=== Ottoman period ===
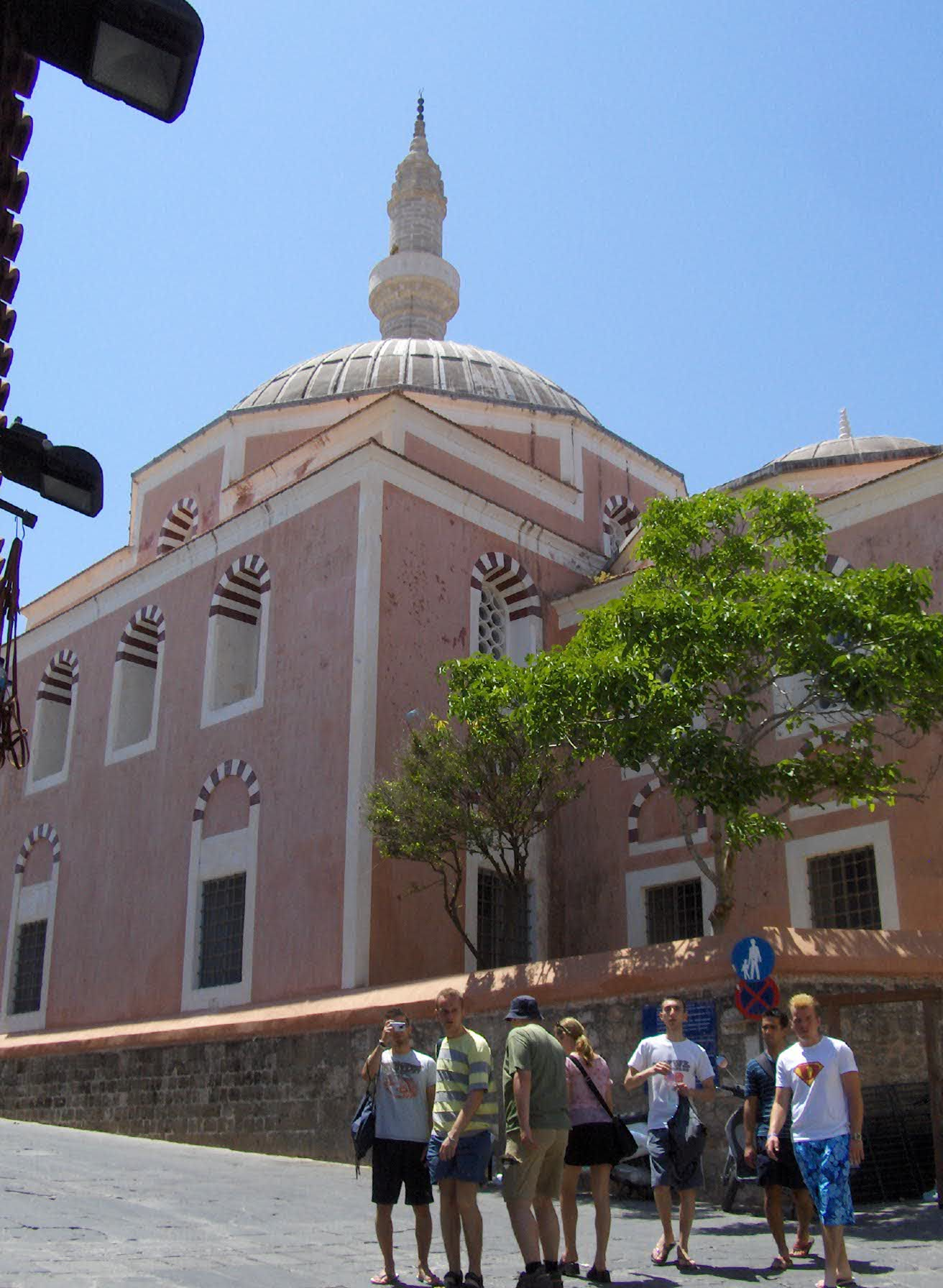
View of the Suleymaniye Mosque

In the Ottoman era, new buildings were constructed: mosques, public baths and mansions for the new patrons. The Greeks were forced to abandon the fortified city and move to new suburbs outside its walls. The city maintained its main economic function as a market for the agricultural products of the interior of the island and the surrounding small islands.

After the establishment of their sovereignty on the island, the Ottoman Turks converted most of the churches into mosques and transformed the major houses into private mansions or public buildings. This transformation was a long-term process that aimed to adapt the buildings to the Ottoman way of living. The Knights period façades with their sculptured decorations, the arched gates and hewn stone walls were enriched with the random character of the Ottoman architecture adapted to the local climate and culture. Ιn this process most of the architectural features of the existing buildings were preserved. The most characteristic additions were the baths (usually in the back of the buildings) and the enclosed wooden balconies on the façades over the narrow streets. In this way most of the buildings of the Hospitaliers' period in the Medieval Town were well preserved. The result was a mixture of oriental architecture with imposing western architectural remains and more recent buildings, which were characteristic of the local architecture of the time.

An interesting example of Ottoman architecture is the building of the Hafiz Ahmed Agha Library.

Ιn the 19th century, the city was the capital of the Eyalet of the Archipelago, but the decline of the Ottoman Empire resulted in the general neglect of the town and its buildings, which further deteriorated due to the strong earthquakes that often plague the area.

In 1856, a gunpowder magazine under the old Church of Saint John – possibly stored there since the siege of 1522 – was struck by lightning, causing a massive explosion that killed many people, destroyed the church, and destroyed much of the Grand Master's Palace.

=== Italian period ===
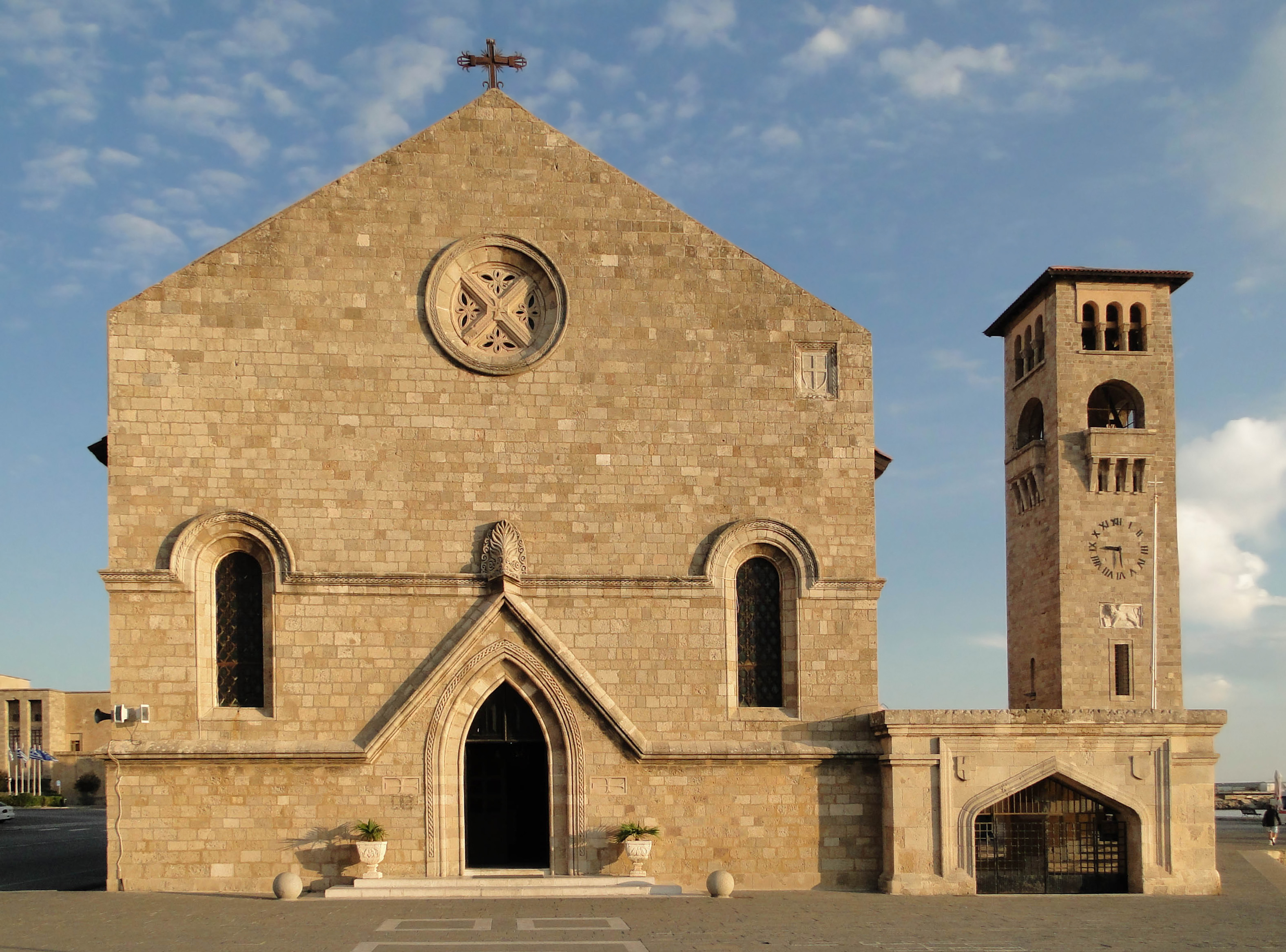
Evangelismos church at the port (former San Giovanni), by Florestano Di Fausto.

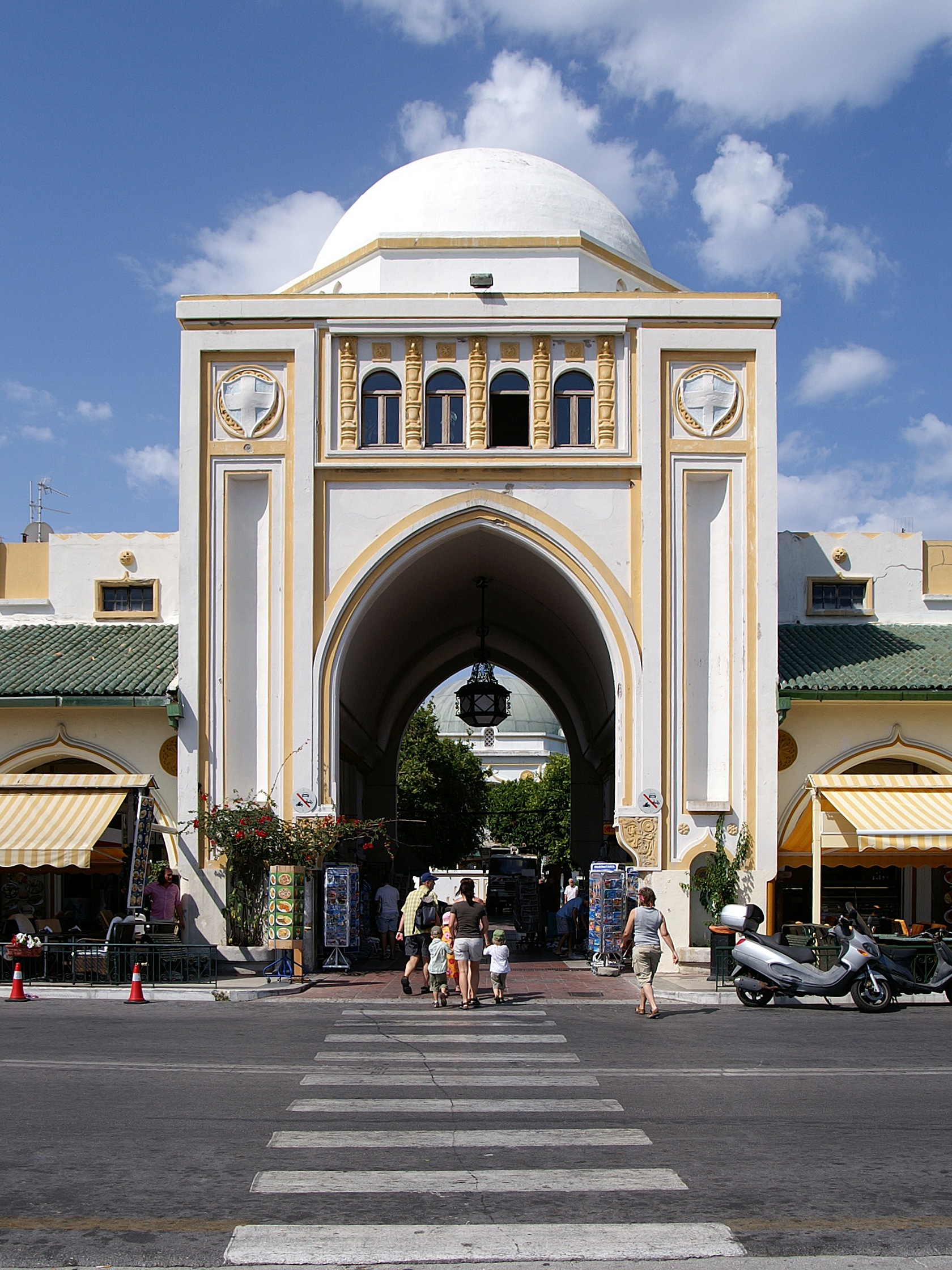
View of the Market (Nea Agora) of Mandraki, built during the Italian period by Florestano Di Fausto.

In 1912 Italian troops took the island over with the rest of the Dodecanese Islands, and established an Italian possession known as Italian Islands of the Aegean in 1923. The architect Florestano Di Fausto can be considered the father of Italian Rhodes. He, in agreement with governor Mario Lago, was author of the city plan of 1923, choosing to respect almost totally the walled town, only demolishing the houses that were built on and around the city walls during the Ottoman era. He also turned the Jewish and Ottoman cemeteries into a green zone surrounding the Medieval Town. At the same time, he designed the new Italian Rhodes in the zone of the Mandraki, planning a Garden City, and building along the main sea promenade the main edifices, as the Market, the Cathedral of Saint John of the Knights, the Palace of the governor. All these building were designed in an eclectic style, mixing Ottoman, Venetian, Renaissance and local elements. The Italians preserved what was left from the Knights' period, and destroyed all Ottoman buildings. They also reconstructed the Grand Master's Palace. Furthermore, an Institute for the study of the History and Culture of the region was established, and major infrastructure work was done to modernize Rhodes.

=== World War II and postwar period ===
During World War II, Allied bombing raids which targeted the old city of Rhodes in 1944 destroyed a significant portion of the city. One of the first decrees of the Greek government designated those areas as reserved for future excavations and a number of edifices as safeguarded buildings. In July 1944, the Nazi authorities ordered the deportation of over 1,700 Jews of Rhodes including men, women, and children, of whom 1,200 were murdered at Auschwitz.

In 1957, a new city plan was approved by a decree and in 1960 the entire medieval town was designated as a protected monument by the Ministry of Culture. In 1961 and 1963 new decrees were issued concerning the new city plan. They provided for the widening of existing streets and the opening of new ones. However, these were not implemented in the old city due to the resistance of the Archaeological Service. In 1988, the old town of Rhodes was designated as a World Heritage City by UNESCO.

== Government ==
Rhodes City is the capital of the island of Rhodes which since 2011 became a single municipality and of the Rhodes regional unit. It was the capital of the former Dodecanese Prefecture and currently hosts many offices and services of the South Aegean region.

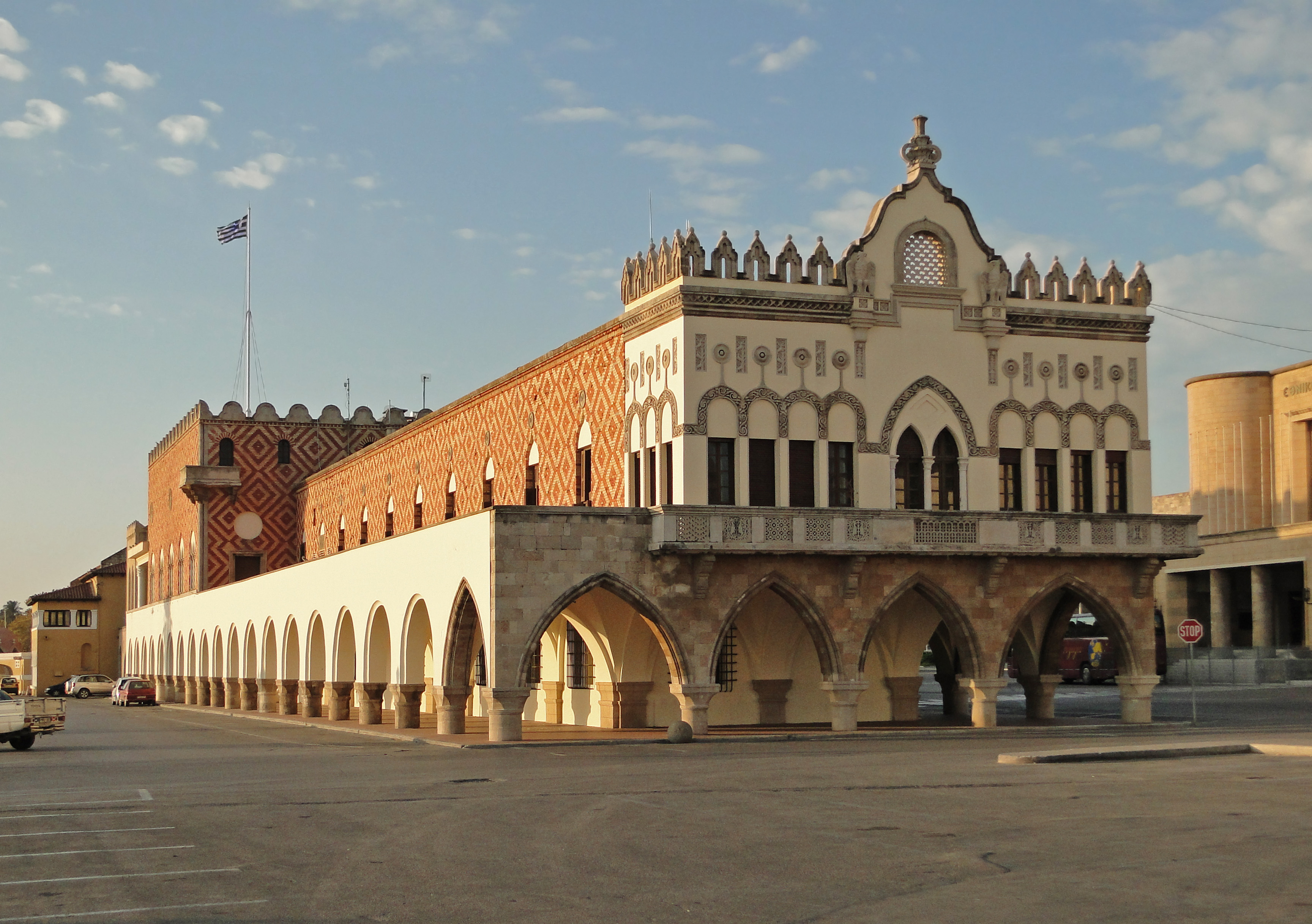
Palazzo del Governo, another work of Di Fausto, now the Prefecture of the Dodecanese.

As an administration centre, the city also hosts numerous offices and services such as:

- Dodecanese Police Headquarters
- Rhodes Fire Department
- Dodecanese Courthouse
- Dodecanese Port Police/Coastguard
- 95 ADTE (Hellenic Army Division Headquarters)
- Rhodes Public Tax Office
- Rhodes Urban Planning Office
- Rhodes Land Registry Office
- Rhodes Hellenic Post Office headquarters
- Rhodes Municipal Water & Sewage Company
- Dodecanese Chamber of Commerce
- Rhodes Manpower Office (OAED)
- Rhodes Social Security Institute (IKA)
- Public Power Corporation (DEI)

== Main sights ==
The city is home to numerous landmarks. Some of them date back to antiquity and most of the others remain from the Hospitaller period.

- Grand Master's Palace (15th century)
- Street of the Knights of Rhodes
  - Holy Trinity church
- La Juderia, including the Kahal Shalom Synagogue
- Acropolis of Rhodes
- Mehmet Aga Mosque
- Mosque of Suleiman the Magnificent
- Medieval walls, created in the mid-14th century on a previous line and remade after the Ottoman siege of 1480 and the earthquake of the following year. In 1522 Suleiman entered the city from the gate of St. Anastasius
- Gothic buildings in the historical upper town.
- Recently, the Byzantine harbor was excavated, discovering unique medieval shipwrecks.
- St. Francis of Assisi Cathedral, Rhodes
- Panagia tou Kastrou
- Rodini Park with the tomb of Ptolemy I Soter, restored during the Italian rule in 1912-1943
Palace of the Grand Master of the Knights of Rhodes

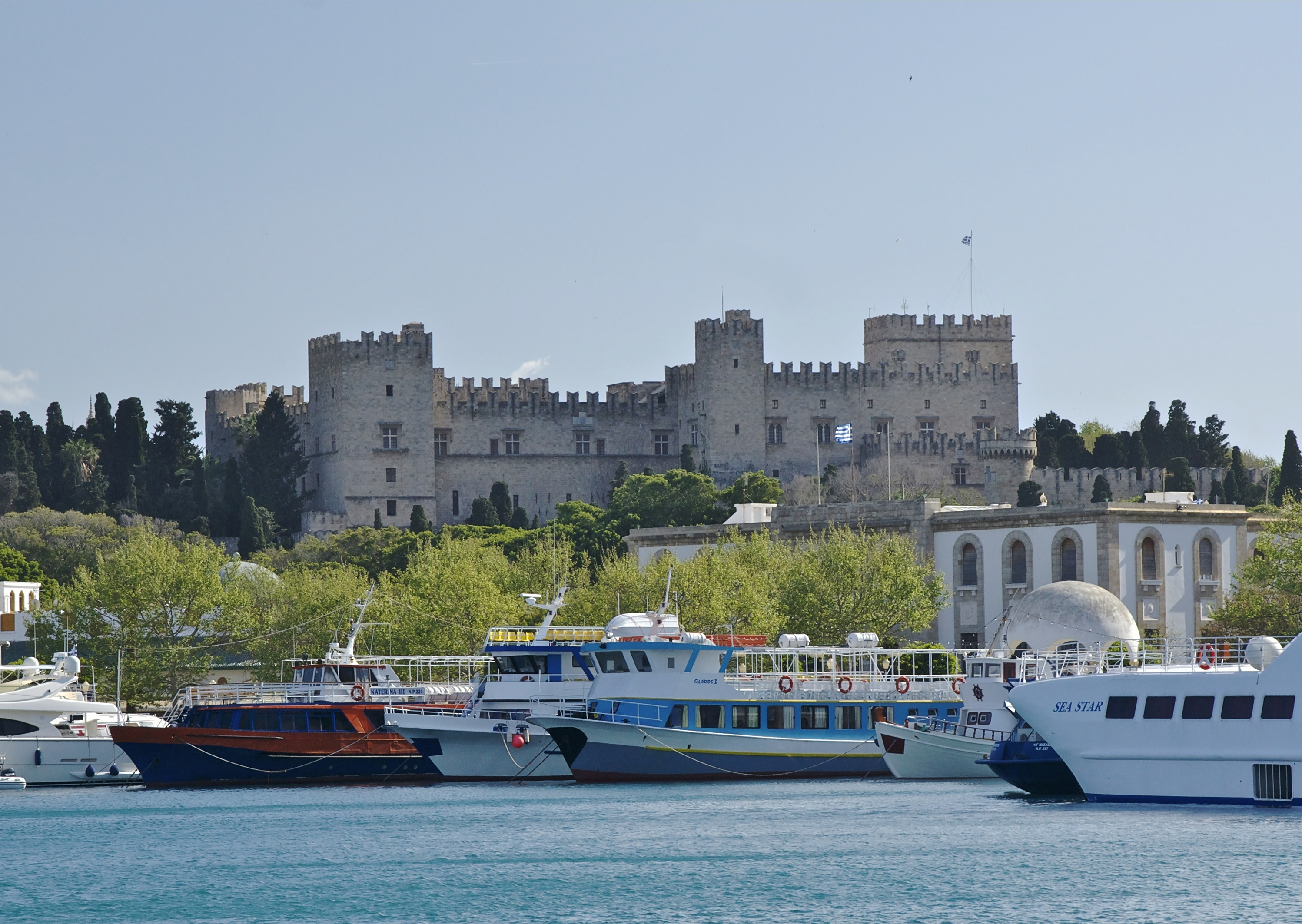

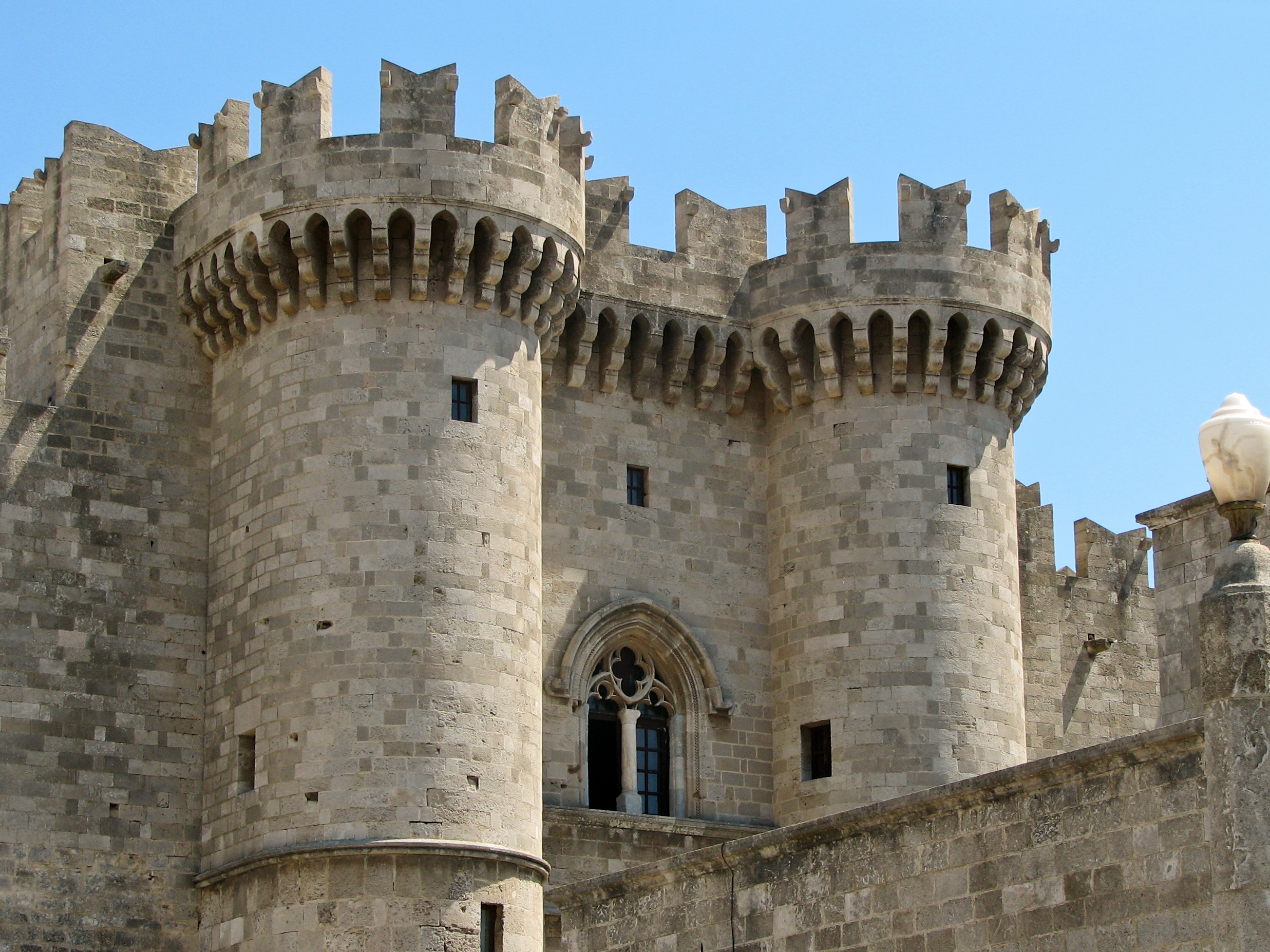
Close-up view of the Palace

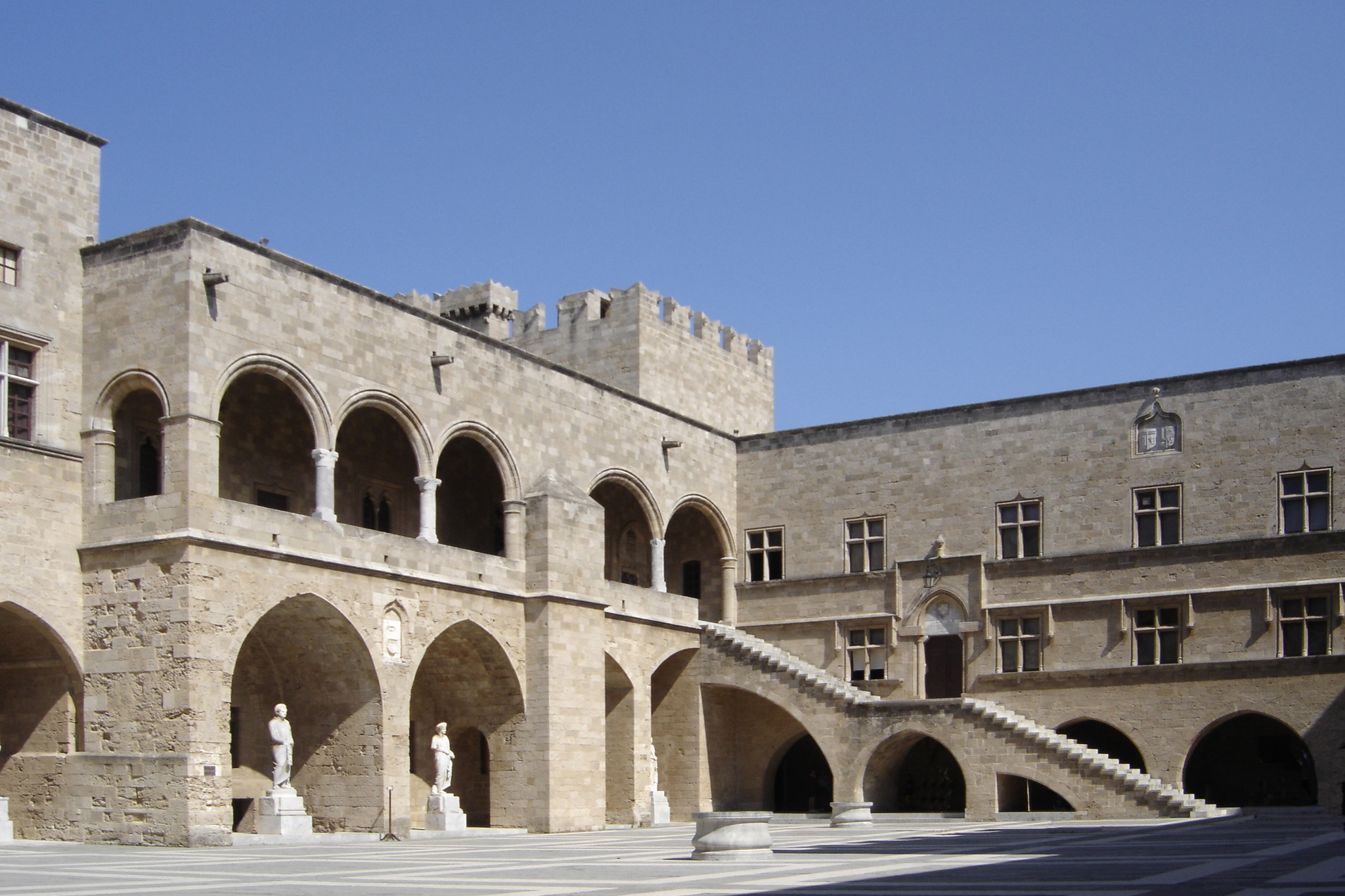
Interior of the palace

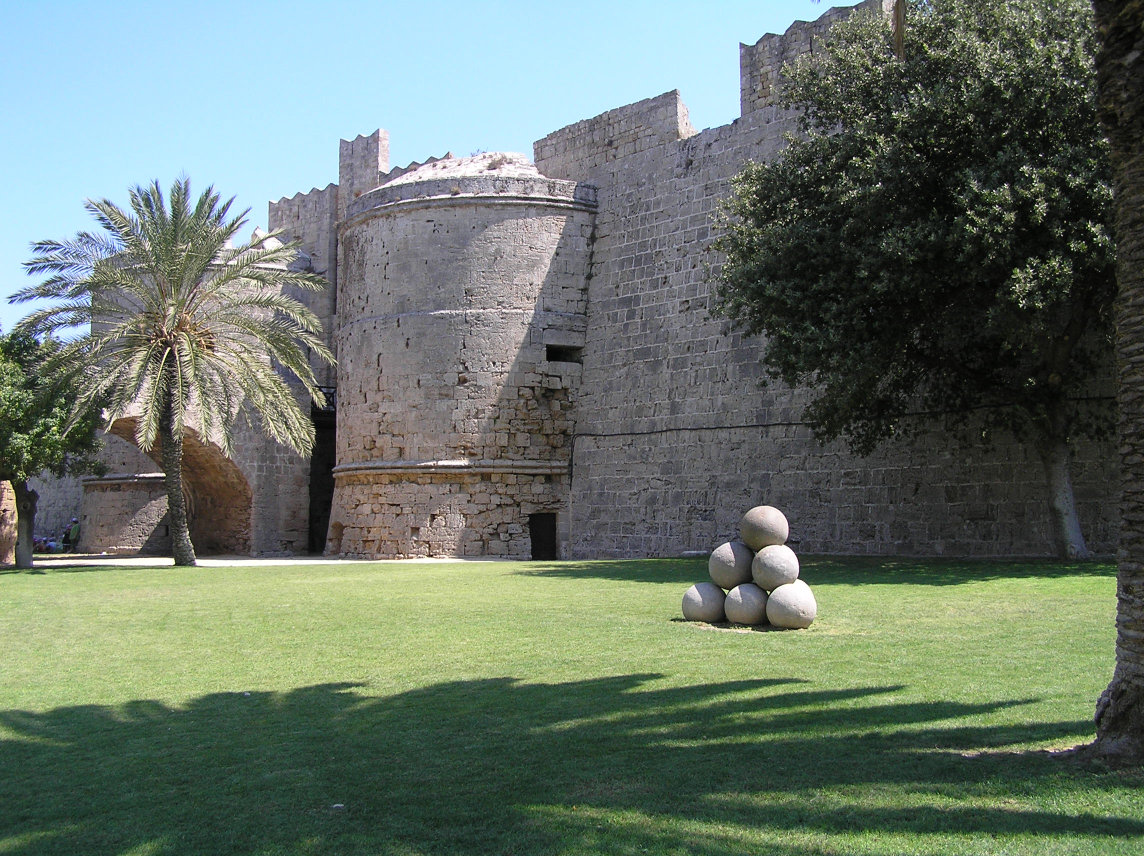
View of the moat

== Geography ==
The city of Rhodes is situated in the north-east tip of the island and forms a triangle from north to south. The municipal unit has an area of 19.481 km^{2}. It is the smallest municipal unit of the island in terms of land area and the largest in population. It borders the Aegean Sea to the north, the east and the west and with the municipalities of Ialysos and Kallithea in the south.

=== Climate ===
In Köppen climate classification, it is classified as hot-summer Mediterranean climate (Csa). According to the data of the meteorological station of the Municipal Port Fund of South Dodecanese, which is located in the Port of Rhodes, the city registers an average annual temperature of 20.9°C. The city of Rhodes falls in 11a hardiness zone.

Climate data for Rhodes Port 4 m a.s.l.
Month	Jan	Feb	Mar	Apr	May	Jun	Jul	Aug	Sep	Oct	Nov	Dec	Year
Record high °C (°F)	20.8 (69.4)	20.9 (69.6)	24.6 (76.3)	27.6 (81.7)	36.4 (97.5)	37.9 (100.2)	37.4 (99.3)	37.6 (99.7)	34.4 (93.9)	32.6 (90.7)	26.8 (80.2)	22.2 (72.0)	37.9 (100.2)
Mean daily maximum °C (°F)	16.1 (61.0)	16.4 (61.5)	17.3 (63.1)	20.2 (68.4)	23.9 (75.0)	27.9 (82.2)	30.9 (87.6)	30.7 (87.3)	28.6 (83.5)	25.6 (78.1)	21.9 (71.4)	18.4 (65.1)	23.2 (73.7)
Daily mean °C (°F)	14.0 (57.2)	14.3 (57.7)	15.1 (59.2)	18.0 (64.4)	21.4 (70.5)	25.3 (77.5)	28.2 (82.8)	28.4 (83.1)	26.5 (79.7)	23.4 (74.1)	19.7 (67.5)	16.3 (61.3)	20.9 (69.6)
Mean daily minimum °C (°F)	11.9 (53.4)	12.2 (54.0)	12.9 (55.2)	15.7 (60.3)	18.9 (66.0)	22.4 (72.3)	25.3 (77.5)	26.0 (78.8)	24.4 (75.9)	21.3 (70.3)	17.5 (63.5)	14.2 (57.6)	18.6 (65.4)
Record low °C (°F)	2.9 (37.2)	4.7 (40.5)	3.8 (38.8)	9.4 (48.9)	14.2 (57.6)	16.2 (61.2)	22.4 (72.3)	23.1 (73.6)	18.7 (65.7)	17.1 (62.8)	9.3 (48.7)	9.0 (48.2)	2.9 (37.2)
Average rainfall mm (inches)	113.6 (4.47)	58.5 (2.30)	44.5 (1.75)	19.2 (0.76)	6.5 (0.26)	6.3 (0.25)	0.1 (0.00)	0.3 (0.01)	14.1 (0.56)	22.3 (0.88)	89.4 (3.52)	144.1 (5.67)	518.9 (20.43)
Mean monthly sunshine hours	155.4	187.0	238.8	269.3	326.8	374.8	393.5	363.7	311.8	264.8	193.7	153.7	3,233.3
Source 1: Municipal Port Fund of South Dodecanese (Jan 2019-Mar 2025)
Source 2: Sunshine Rhodes AP

Climate data for Rhodes International Airport, Paradeisi 7 m a.s.l. (1995-2025). Extremes 1977-present
Month	Jan	Feb	Mar	Apr	May	Jun	Jul	Aug	Sep	Oct	Nov	Dec	Year
Record high °C (°F)	21.0 (69.8)	22.6 (72.7)	27.6 (81.7)	29.6 (85.3)	34.6 (94.3)	39.4 (102.9)	38.0 (100.4)	40.2 (104.4)	34.8 (94.6)	33.0 (91.4)	28.0 (82.4)	23.4 (74.1)	40.2 (104.4)
Mean daily maximum °C (°F)	15.3 (59.5)	15.6 (60.1)	17.3 (63.1)	20.2 (68.4)	24.0 (75.2)	27.9 (82.2)	30.5 (86.9)	30.7 (87.3)	28.2 (82.8)	24.6 (76.3)	20.7 (69.3)	17.0 (62.6)	22.7 (72.8)
Daily mean °C (°F)	13.1 (55.6)	13.2 (55.8)	14.7 (58.5)	17.4 (63.3)	21.1 (70.0)	25.0 (77.0)	27.5 (81.5)	27.9 (82.2)	25.5 (77.9)	21.9 (71.4)	18.0 (64.4)	14.7 (58.5)	20.0 (68.0)
Mean daily minimum °C (°F)	10.9 (51.6)	10.8 (51.4)	12.1 (53.8)	14.5 (58.1)	18.1 (64.6)	22.0 (71.6)	24.5 (76.1)	25.1 (77.2)	22.9 (73.2)	19.3 (66.7)	15.4 (59.7)	12.4 (54.3)	17.3 (63.2)
Record low °C (°F)	1.4 (34.5)	1.2 (34.2)	1.8 (35.2)	5.8 (42.4)	11.0 (51.8)	14.4 (57.9)	17.5 (63.5)	21.0 (69.8)	17.0 (62.6)	8.8 (47.8)	6.0 (42.8)	4.0 (39.2)	1.2 (34.2)
Average rainfall mm (inches)	133.4 (5.25)	84.3 (3.32)	57.6 (2.27)	32.7 (1.29)	18.7 (0.74)	2.0 (0.08)	0.7 (0.03)	1.3 (0.05)	7.9 (0.31)	42.0 (1.65)	95.7 (3.77)	138.0 (5.43)	614.3 (24.19)
Mean monthly sunshine hours	152.2	171.5	233.2	276.3	317.6	371.2	391.6	359.4	307.4	254.9	189.3	150.3	3,174.9
Source: Hellenic National Meteorological Service (Sep 1995-Aug 2025), Infoclimat, Extremes from 1977, Sunshine (Aug 2009-Aug 2025)

Sea temperature for Rhodes
Month	Jan	Feb	Mar	Apr	May	Jun	Jul	Aug	Sep	Oct	Nov	Dec	Year
Average sea temperature °C (°F)	17.9 (64.2)	17.0 (62.6)	17.1 (62.8)	17.6 (63.7)	20.1 (68.2)	23.4 (74.1)	25.9 (78.6)	27.2 (81.0)	26.7 (80.1)	23.8 (74.8)	20.9 (69.6)	18.8 (65.8)	21.4 (70.5)
Mean daily daylight hours	10.0	11.0	12.0	13.0	14.0	15.0	14.0	13.0	12.0	11.0	10.0	10.0	12.1
Average Ultraviolet index	2	3	5	7	8	10	10	9	7	5	3	2	5.9
Source: Weather Atlas

== Demographics ==
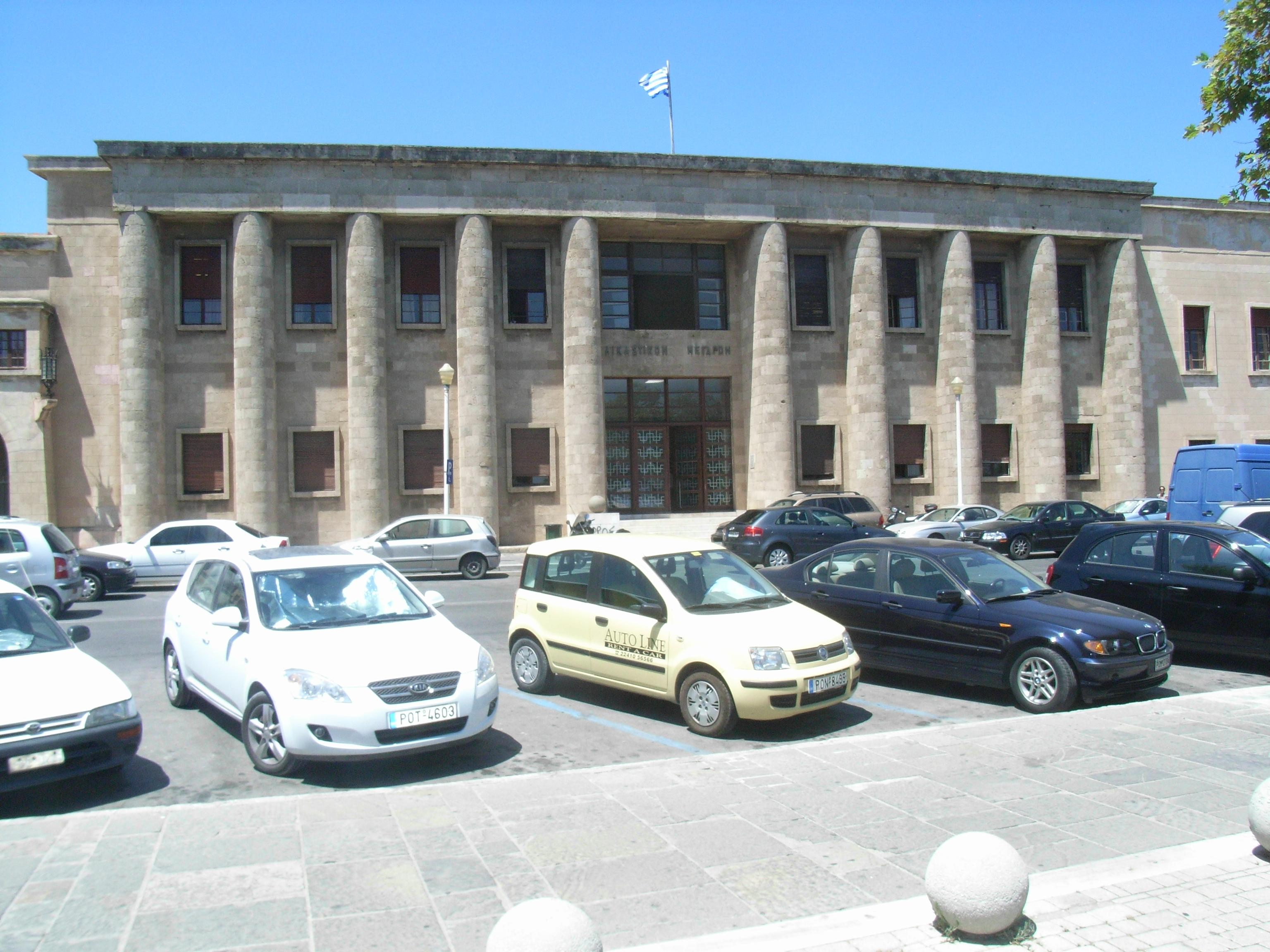
Rhodes courthouse (Di Fausto)

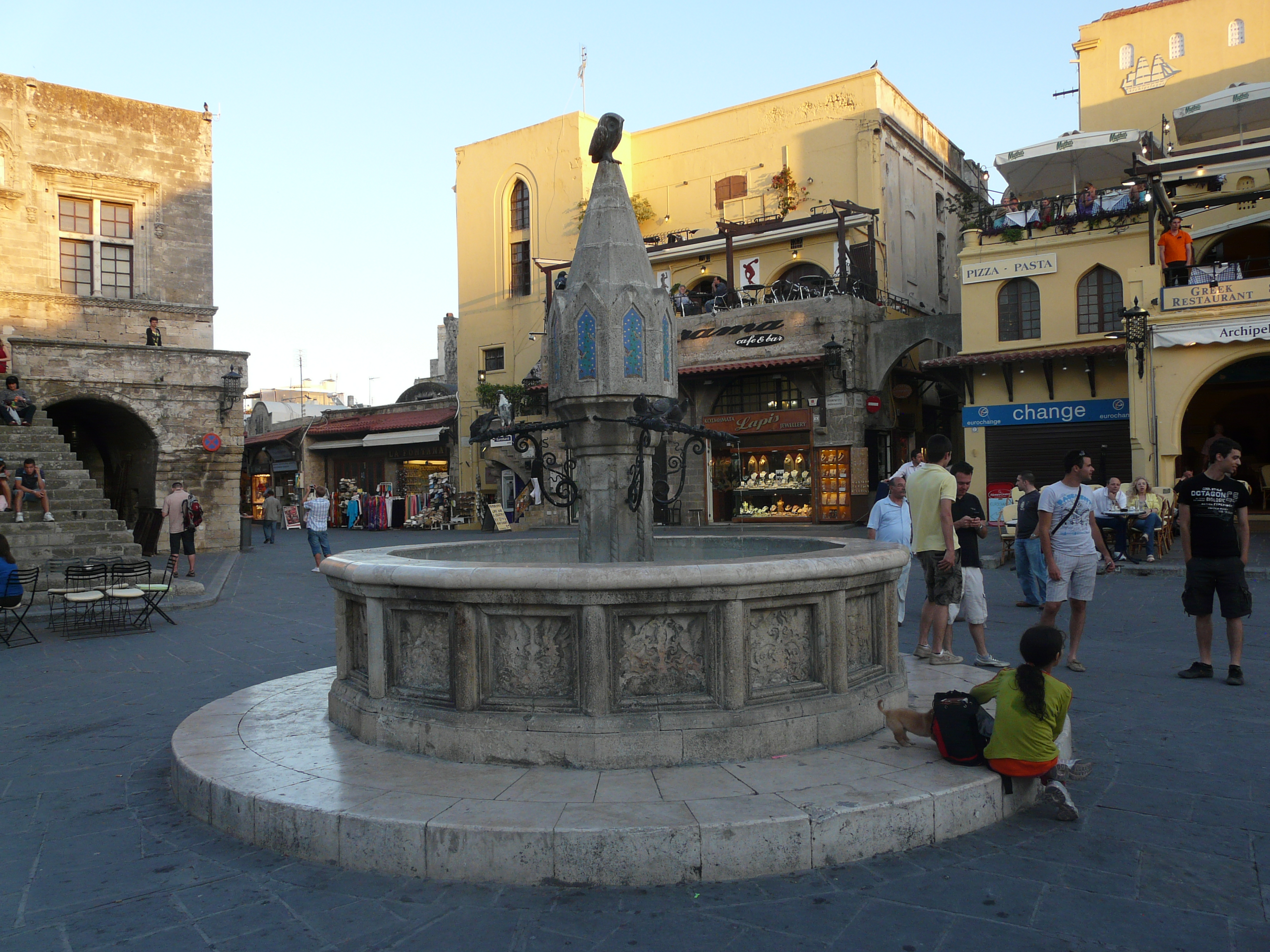
Medieval fountain at Hippokratous Square.

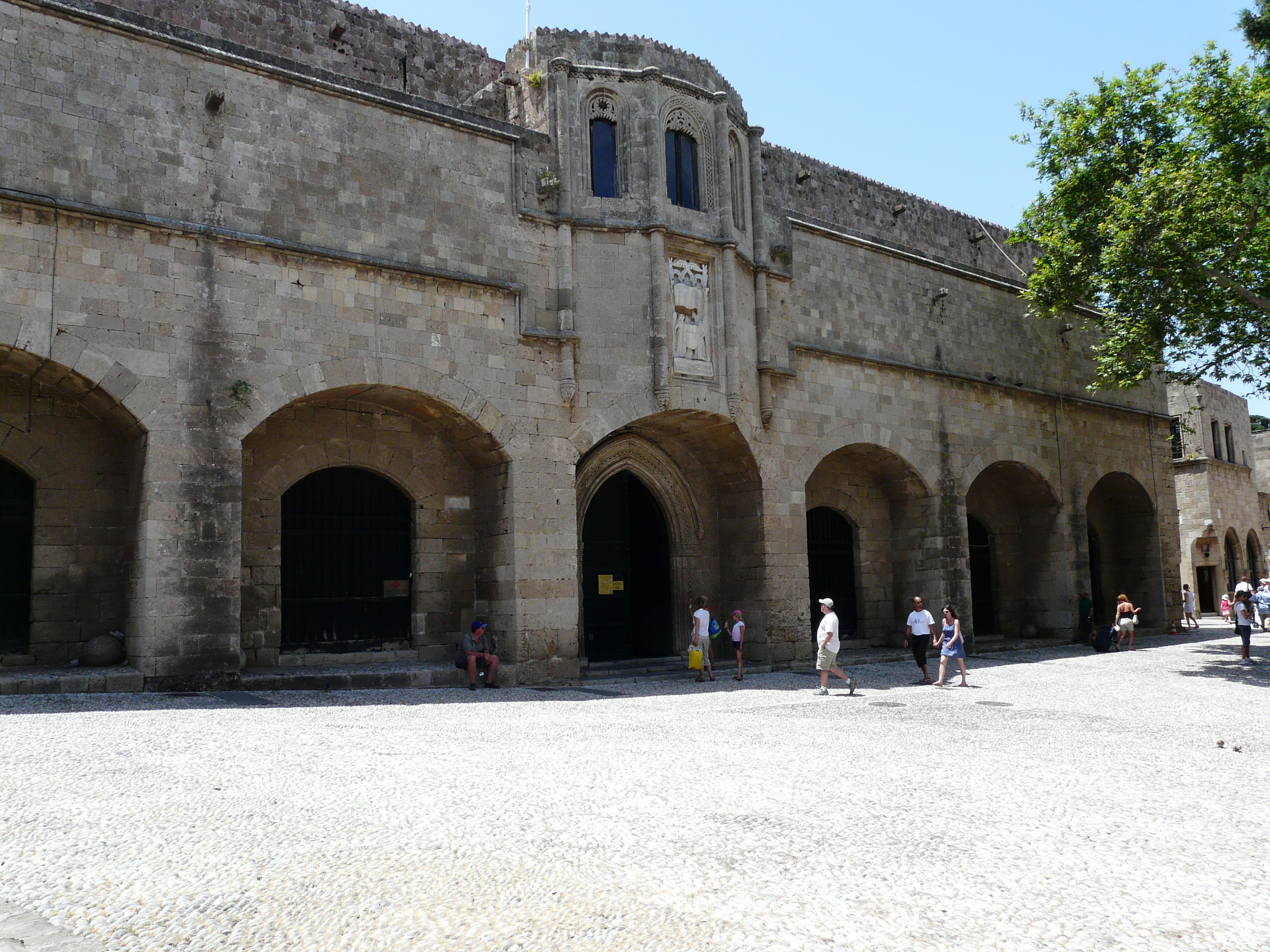
The entrance to the Rhodes Archaeology Museum.

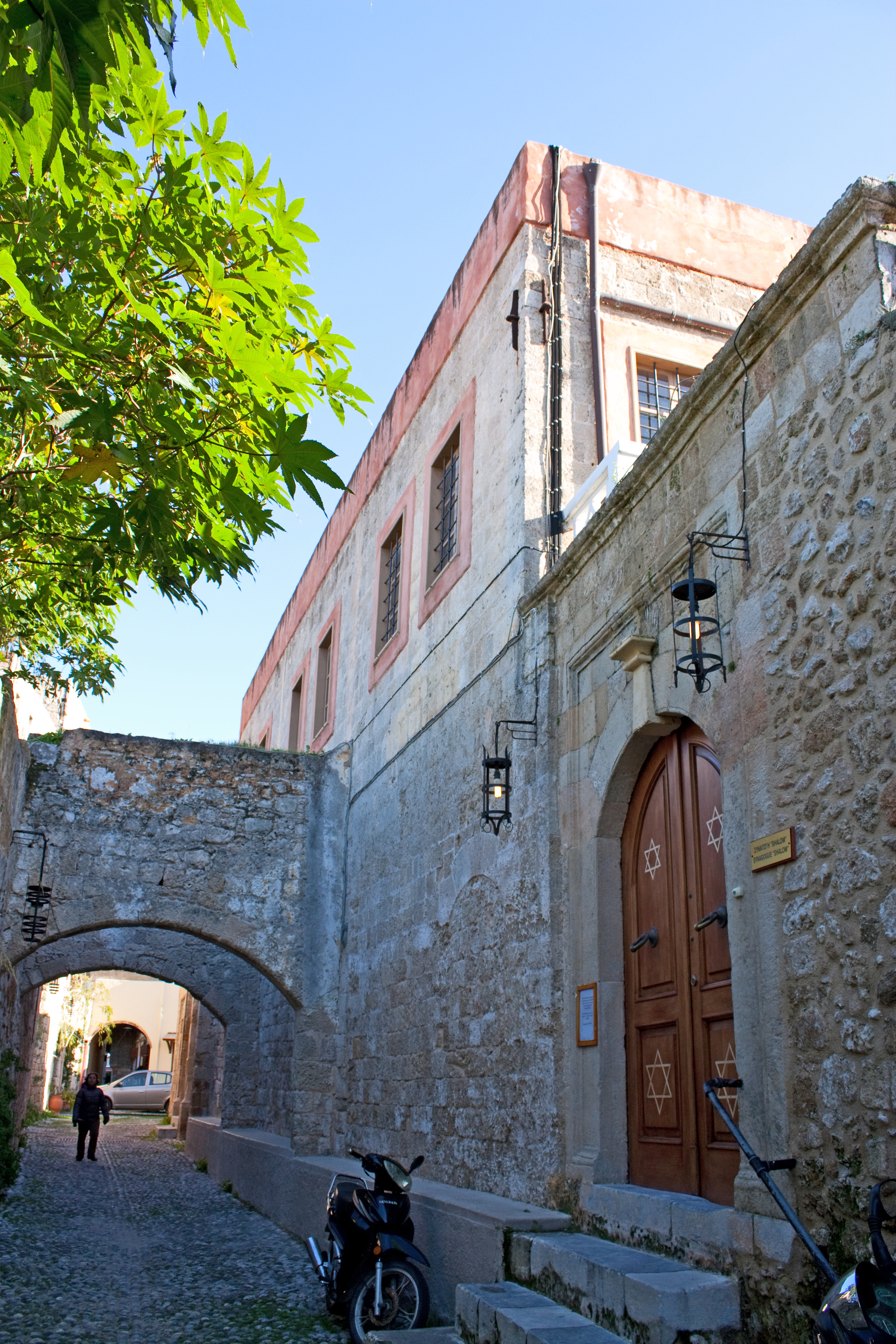
Kahal Shalom Synagogue

The city has an official permanent population of 49,541 in 2011 census but its estimated that some 65–70.000 reside permanently within city limits. During summer population reaches 100.000 due to some 25–30.000 hotel beds operating within city limits as well numerous seasonal workers that migrate from rest of Greece due to high unemployment mostly in peninsular parts of the country.

Year	Population	Change ±
1951	24,280	-
1961	28,119	+3,839
1971	33,100	+4,981
1981	41,425	+8,325
1991	43,558	+2,133
2001	53,709	+10,151
2011	49,541	-4,168
2021	56,440	+6,899

== Education ==
State facilities by category:

- Primary Education: 21 primary schools
- Secondary Education: 7 high schools and 7 lyceums
- Higher Education: Some departments of the Aegean University, Higher and Lower Tourism Schools and some private institutes

The last years two private schools were also established and offer classes from primary to lyceum education with one located within city limits, Rodion Paideia. The Music School of Rhodes is located just outside Rhodes, in Koskinou village.

== Health ==
Rhodes state general hospital is located in the southwestern district of Agioi Apostoloi. Erected less than 20 years ago, it is a modern facility with many departments as well the base for EKAV ambulances serving the city and island's northern part. Hospital is also equipped with a helicopter landing zone being able to accept urgent cases via airlifts from the rest Dodecanese islands.

A private hospital, Euromedica, also operates just off city limits, in Koskinou western edge. Numerous private medical facilities also operate within city while many private doctors keep their clinics in and around city centre.

== Transportation ==
=== Air ===
Both the city and the island of Rhodes are served by Diagoras International Airport, situated 14 km (9 mi) south west of the city. It is connected to all other major Greek airports and to Cyprus throughout the year. During tourism season, international flights connect the island with numerous European cities and with Israel, Egypt and Lebanon.

=== Sea ===
The city hosts 3 major ports that each serve a different purpose. Kolona serves intra-Dodecanese traffic, Central serves cruise ships and international traffic and Akandia domestic as well cargo traffic.

Ferries connect daily the island with several nearby islands within the Dodecanese Islands, as well as with the Cycladic Islands and the Greek mainland (Pireaus) while twice weekly a ferry goes to Heraklion, Crete. There are also frequently routes to opposing Turkish coast towns such as Marmaris and Fethiye. Rhodes is also a popular port of call for cruise itineraries, especially in the summer months.

City also hosts two marinas, a municipal one in downtown Mandraki and a private one next to Akandia port.

=== Surface ===
The city's public transit system is served by municipal bus company RODA (blue and/or white buses) and consists of a bus network which connects city centre to districts but also connects the city to outlying resorts and towns (Faliraki in the east and Ixia, Ialysos, Tholos in the west) as well Rhodes International Airport. The city centre is also the point of departure for KTEL buses (orange buses) that serve island's east coast suburban routes. There is a proposal for KTEL buses to relocate in available space next to Akandia port but its still unknown if and when this will happen.

Taxis are widely available in the city and usually can be found in designated taxi ranks or via phone call. It is normal during high season rush hours to queue in ranks due to increased demand.

Plans for a 16 km tram network consisting of 2 lines and 13 stations were presented years ago but since then nothing further emerged probably due to lack of funds.

City's road network is mostly old consisting mainly of narrow and one way streets and major arteries can't really cope with increased traffic making congestion unavoidable especially rush hours. Parking especially around city centre and during market hours as well summer season is extremely difficult due to lack of free spaces although it is monitored by the municipality imposing a fee. The municipality is currently redeveloping certain free areas near the centre to parking lots which are expected to lower traffic burden. A ring road also exists but it is unfinished connecting currently Rhodes Port to Rhodes-Kallithea Avenue. City is also the starting point of 3 of island's 5 main avenues connecting it with Faliraki through Rhodes-Kallithea Avenue, Lindos through Rhodes-Lindos Avenue and west coast (Ialysos, Airport, Tholos, Kamiros) through Rhodes-Kamiros Avenue.

== Media ==
=== Television and radio ===
Most major nationwide television stations broadcast in the city. There are also five local television stations and a number of local and national radio stations.

=== Newspapers ===
There are two daily newspapers issued that deal with both the city and the whole region. Moreover, there are few others with specific themes.

- I Rodiaki ΡΟΔΙΑΚΗ - Καθημερινή Πρωινή Εφημερίδα (translated "The Rhodian", daily exc. Mondays)
- I Dimokratiki Δημοκρατική της Ρόδου (translated "The Democrat", daily exc. Mondays)

== Sports ==
The city after a long dark period of almost 15 years is reviving in many team sports. Football and basketball are the most popular but a wide variety is also in development during the last years with the most noticeable in rugby.

=== Football ===
The city has two major football teams; Diagoras GS and AS Rodos after a long period are back in national level and competed in Greek National Second Division (Football League) during 2017–18 season with the latter being relegated to local league. Rest of the city-based teams compete in the local Amateur Divisions and include teams that once competed in national level such as ARS Rodiakos and DANS Dorieas.

=== Basketball ===
Basketball has been represented at national level by Kolossos Rodou BC, which has competed in National A1 Ethniki since 2007. Other teams, either active or defunct, are AS Diagoras Rhodes with notable presence some years ago in national lower-level leagues C and B, Rodion Athlisis, Galazia Akadimia and now defunct ASK Ibiskos, DANS Dorieas and AS Rodos. City also hosts AS Dodekanisos, the pride of the Aegean that competes and stars in the national basketball league for handicapped people.

=== Volleyball ===
Rodion Athlisis competes successfully during the last years in A2 Ethniki Volleyball and lost promotion to top tier A1 Ethniki Volleyball for 2 consecutive seasons (2017 and 2018) in playoff games. Rest of city based teams compete in local level.

=== Other ===
A variety of other sports is also available and in development in the city. In rugby the recently formed Colossoi of Rhodes reached the top league finals for the second time in a row. The Nautical Club of Rhodes and Ygros Stivos of Rhodes have water polo teams in low level national divisions; the Rhodian Tennis Club play tennis and ping-pong in its privately owned facilities; AS Diagoras Rhodes have competitive teams in cycling and in track and field athletics. Finally, jiu jitsu, karate, tae-kwon-do and other Eastern oriented sports are available with local teams that enjoy sporadic national success.

=== Sports venues ===
The city has three major sports venues; the Rhodes Municipal Stadium and the Kallipateira National Athletic Center serve all outdoor activities while the Municipal Indoor Hall of "Venetokleio" serves indoor sports. Agioi Apostoloi municipal stadium serves solely football while privately owned indoor sports arenas are held by Diagoras and Rodion Athlisis clubs with the latter owning and operating also a 25-m indoor swimming pool as well.

== International relations ==
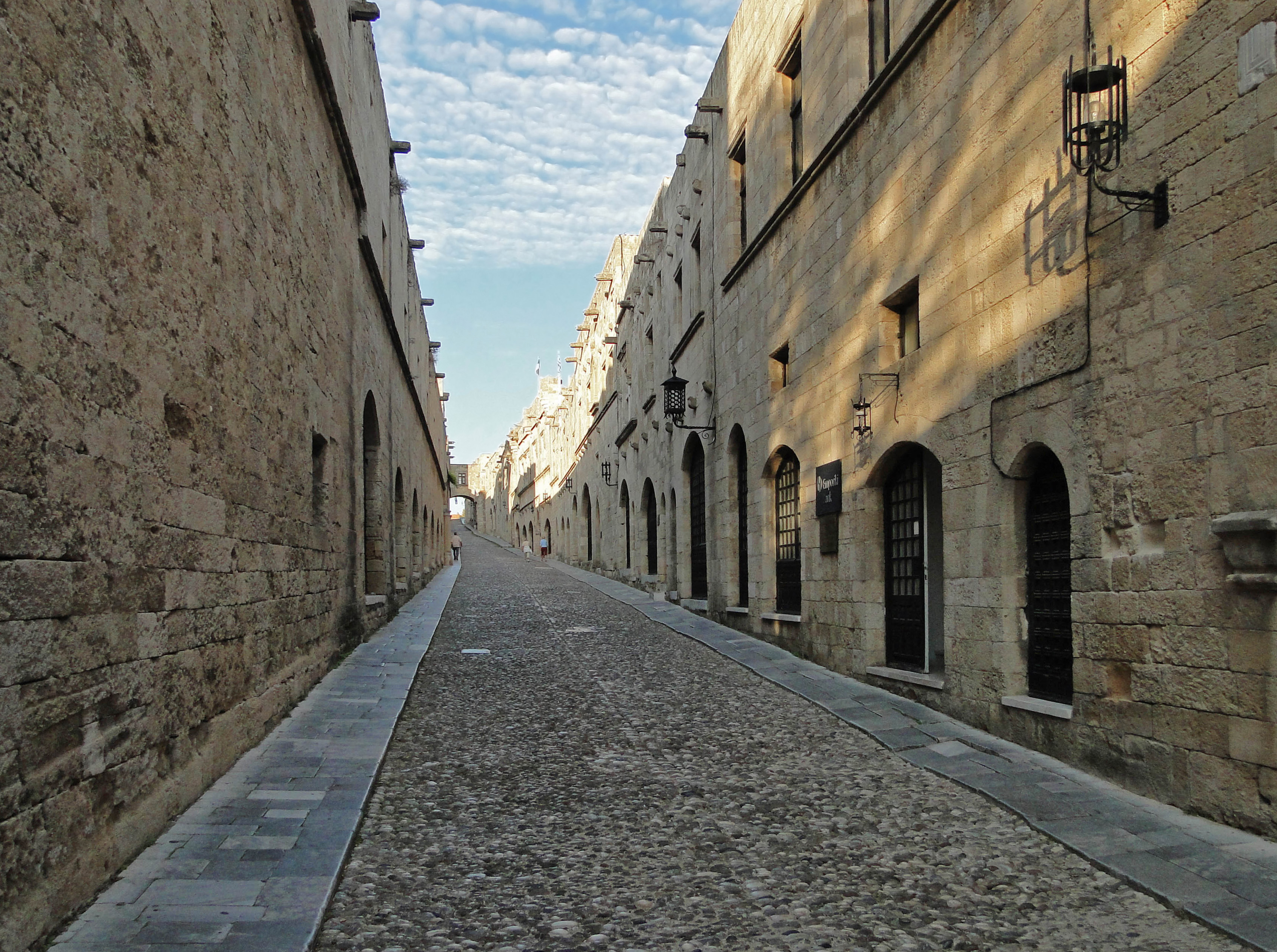
The Avenue of the Knights.

=== Consulates ===
The city of Rhodes is also home to many foreign consulates.

- Austria
- Belgium
- Denmark
- Finland
- France
- Germany
- Hungary
- Italy
- Netherlands
- Spain
- Sweden
- Turkey
- United Kingdom

=== Twin towns – sister cities ===
Rhodes is twinned with:

- Ávila, Spain
- New Braunfels, United States
- Conches-en-Ouche, France
- Gotland, Sweden
- Limassol, Cyprus
- Perth, Australia
- Pisa, Italy
- Puebla, Mexico
- Rhode Island, United States
- Roses, Spain
- Valletta, Malta
- Yalta, Ukraine

== Notable people ==
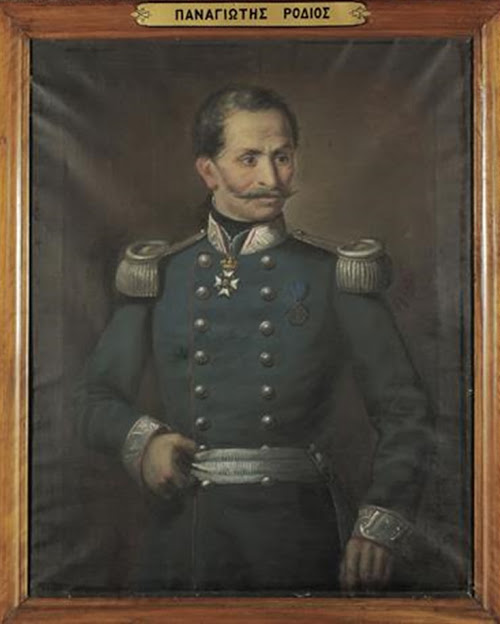
Panagiotis Rodios

Ancient

- Diagoras of Rhodes
- Apollonius of Rhodes, poet
- Dinocrates, architect
- Hieronymus of Rhodes, philosopher
- Panaetius, philosopher

Modern

- Panagiotis Rodios, military officer, fighter during the Greek War of Independence
- Reşit Galip, Turkish politician
- Oreste Lionello, Italian actor
- Georgios Skartados, football player
- Niki Xanthou, Greek athlete

== Gallery ==
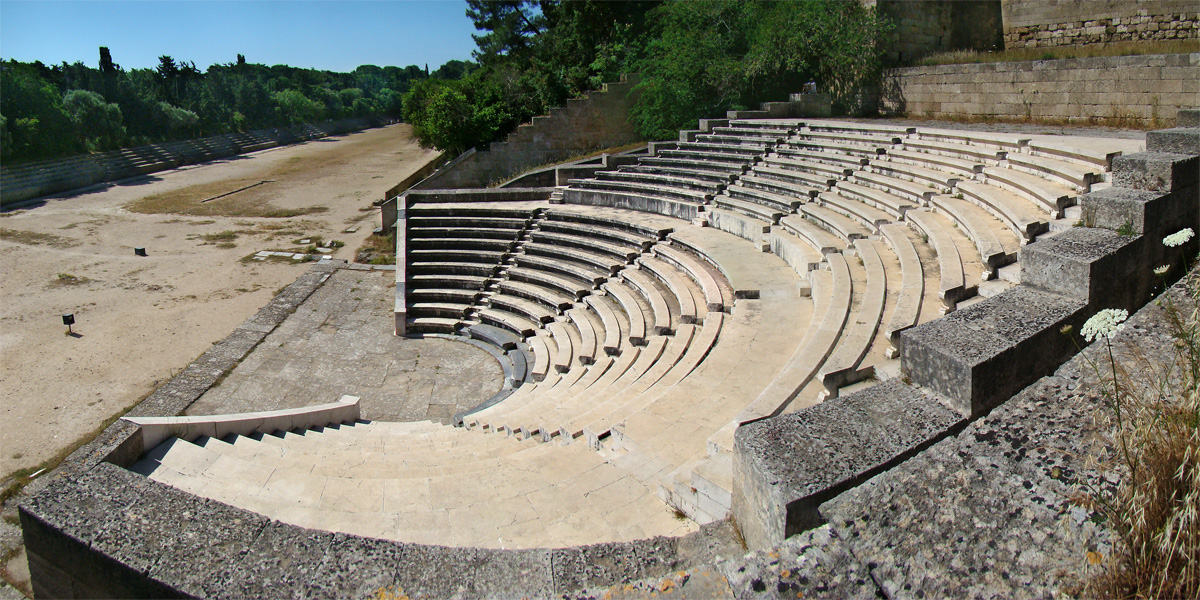
The ancient theatre, Acropolis of Rhodes

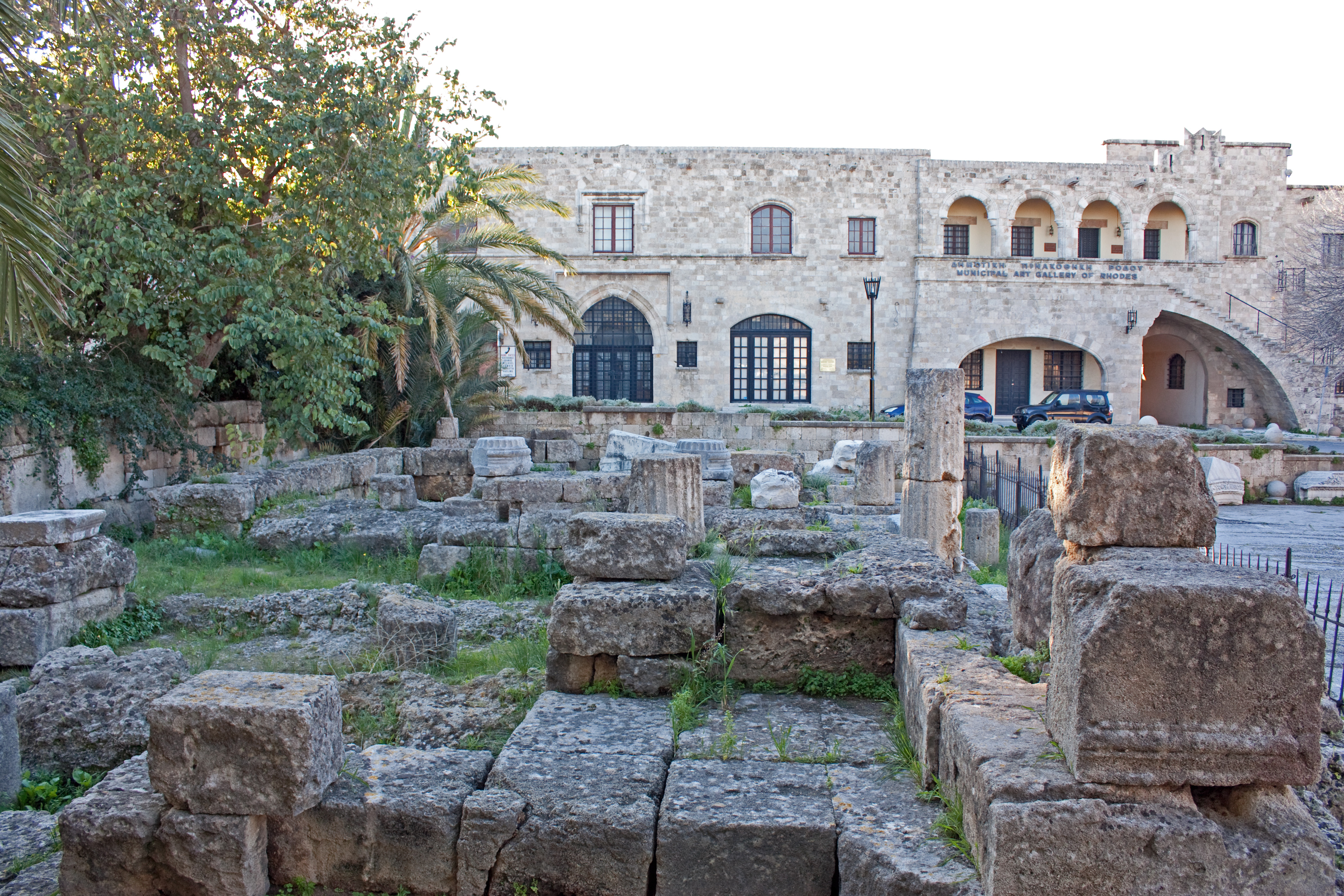
Remains of the Temple of Aphrodite, c.3rd century BC

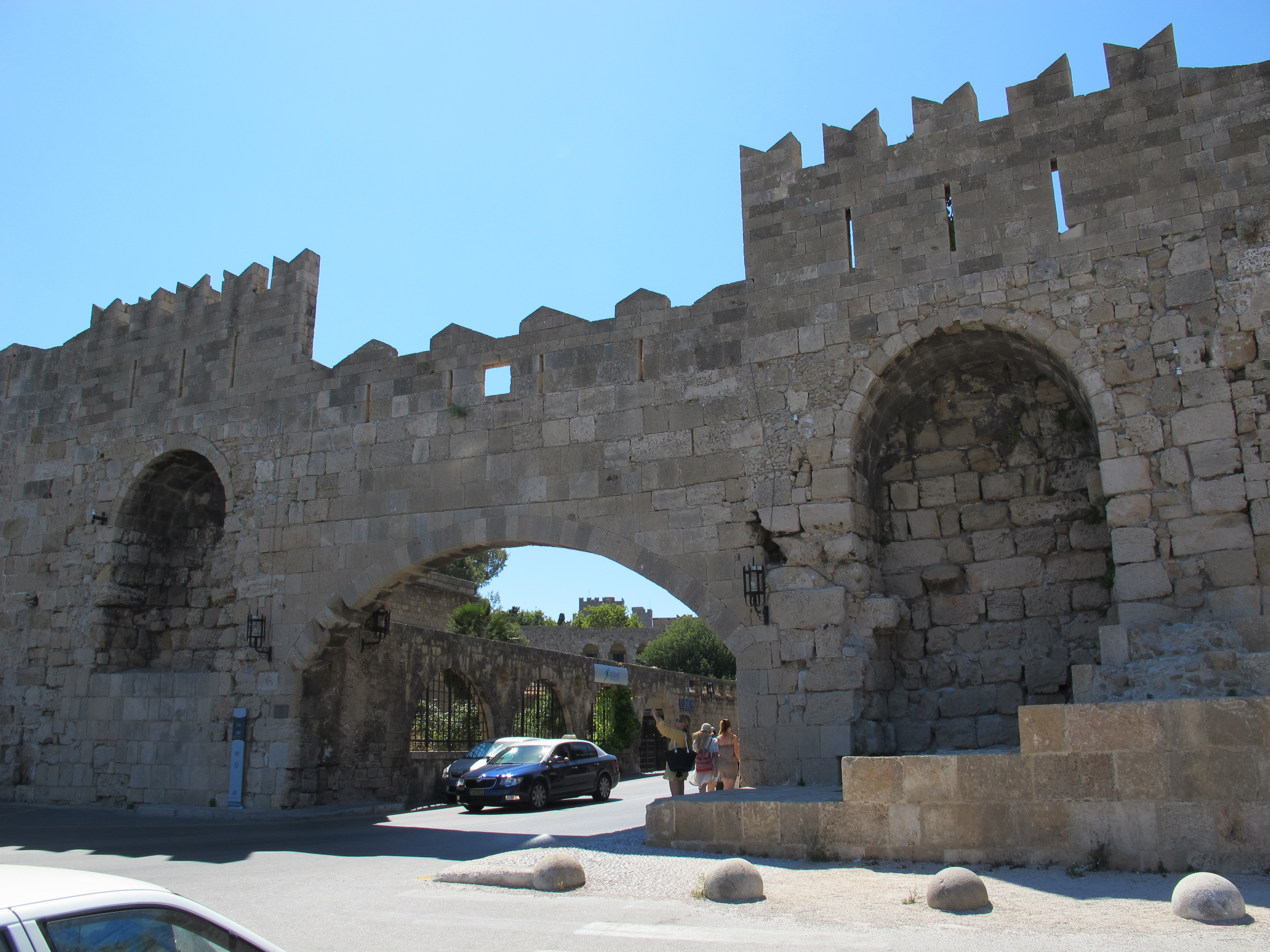
Gate of the arsenal

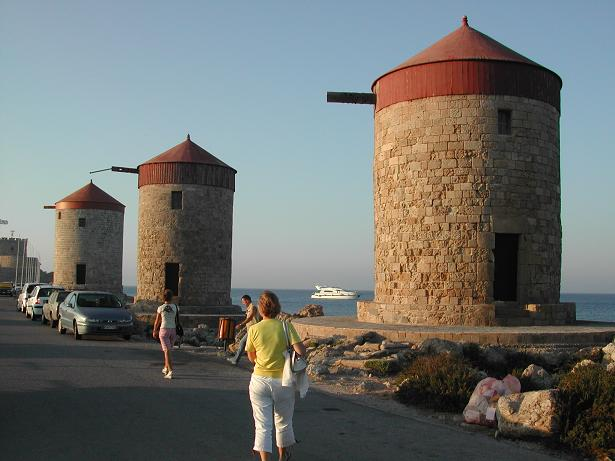
Windmills

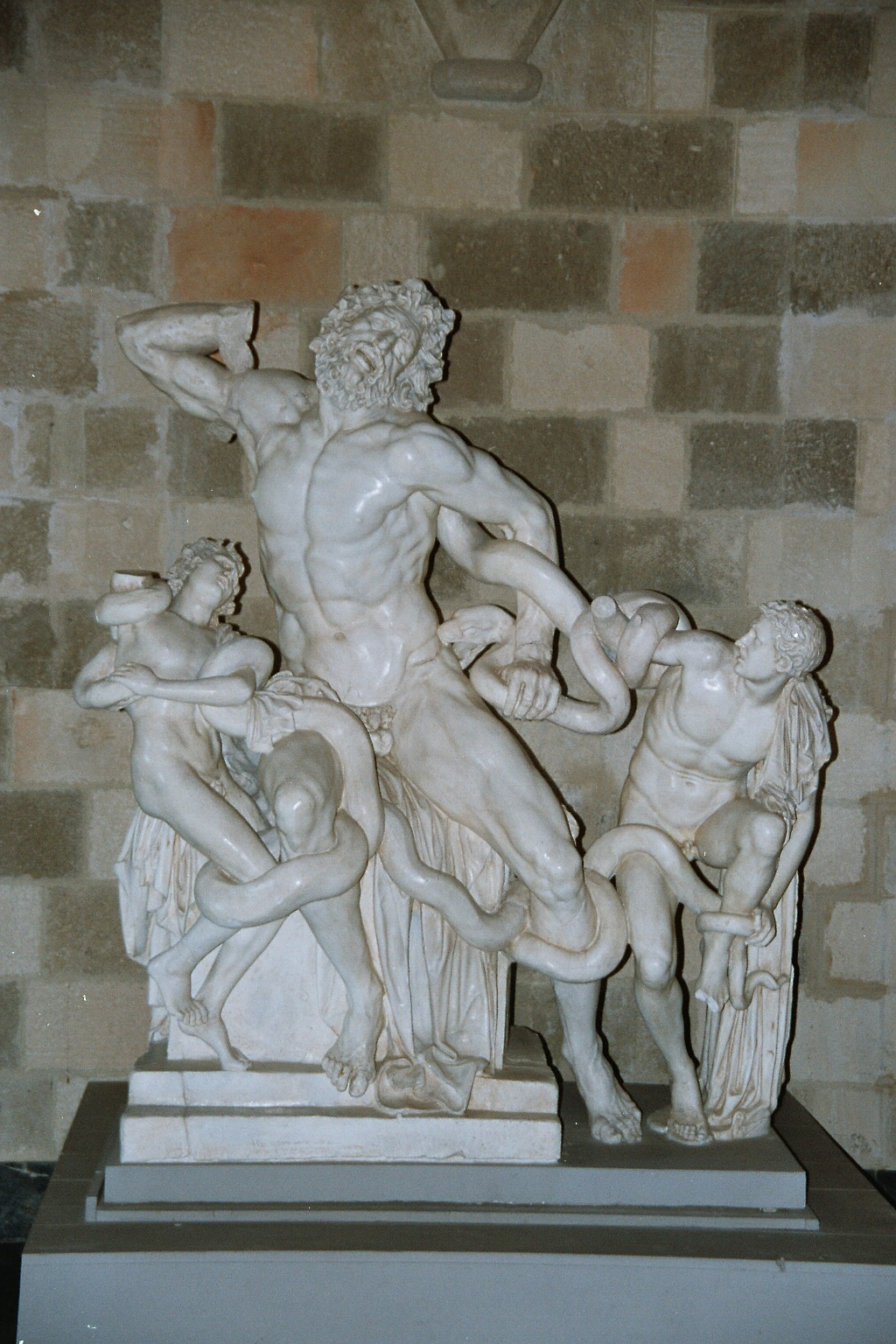
Laocoön and His Sons; copy in the Grand Master's Palace

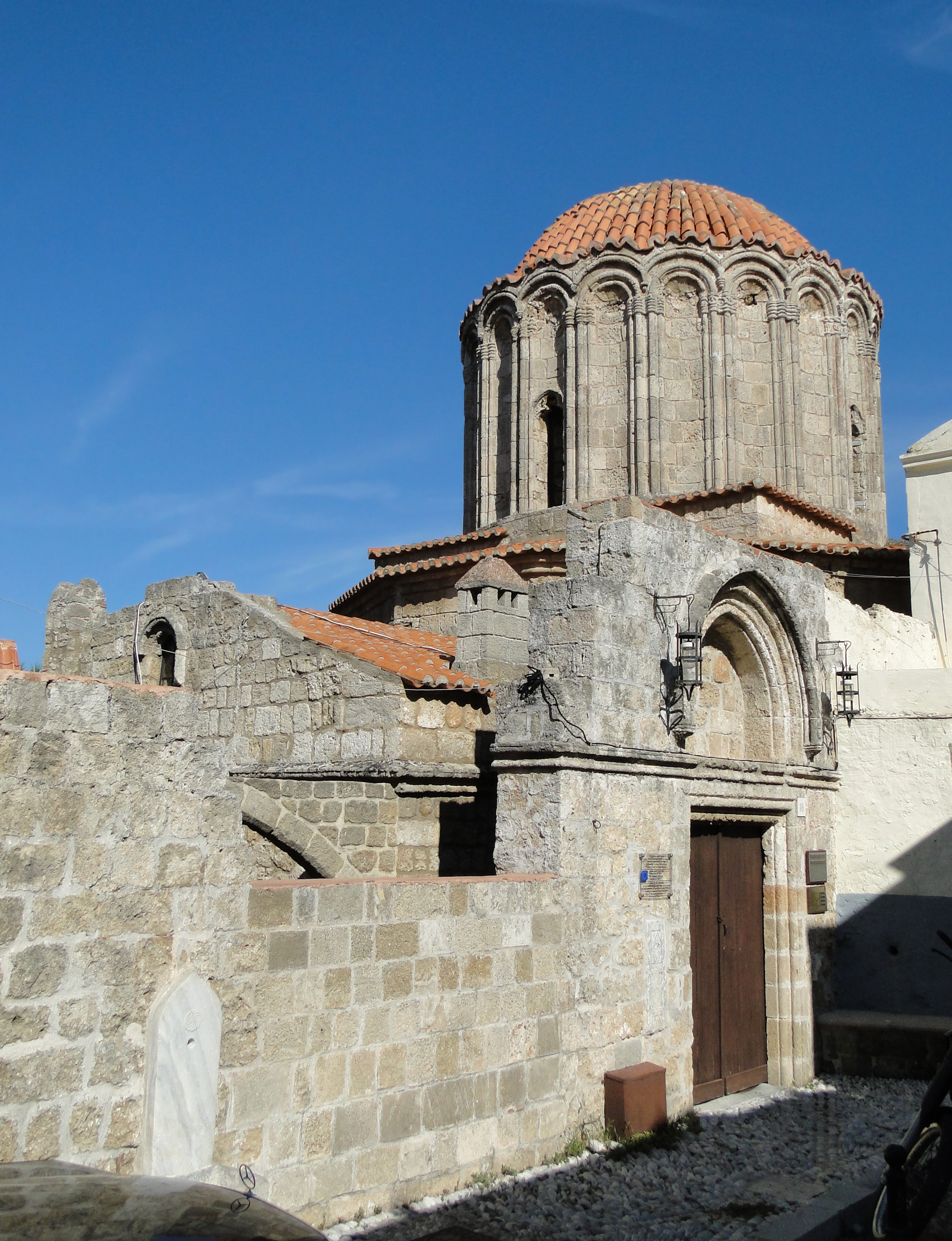
Byzantine church of Agios Georgios

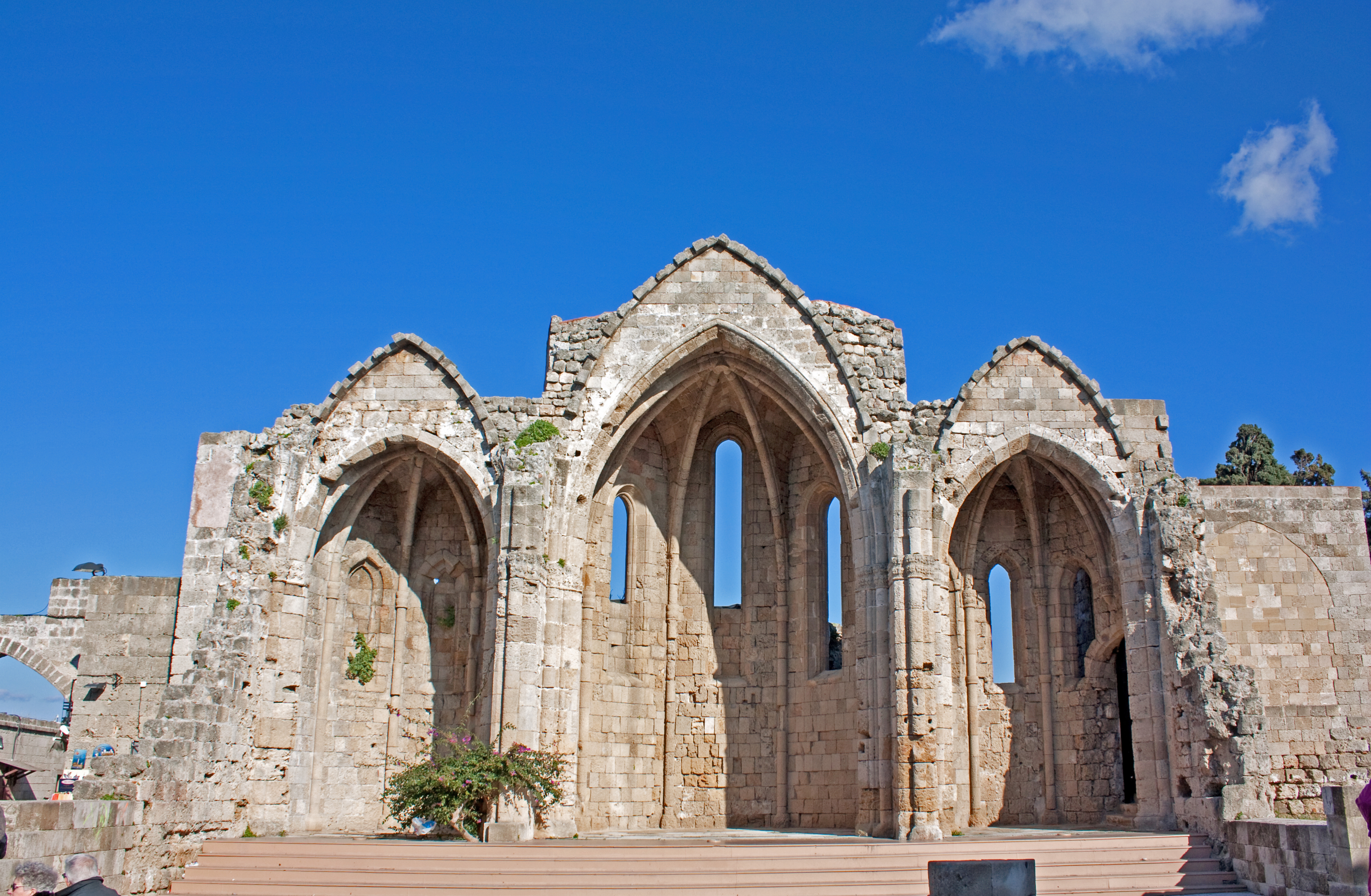
Medieval church of the Virgin

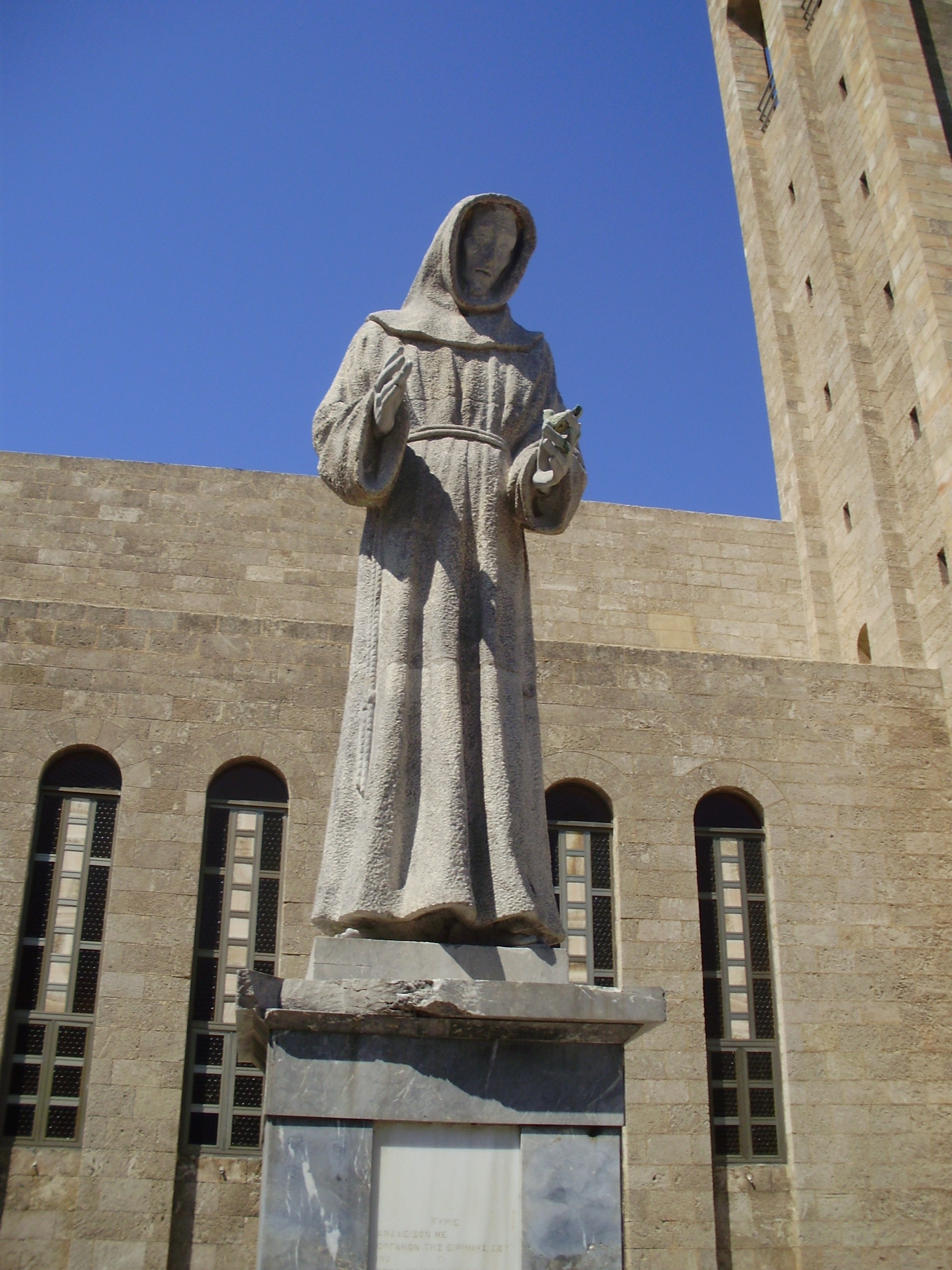
Statue of Francis of Assisi in front of the St. Francis of Assisi Cathedral, Rhodes

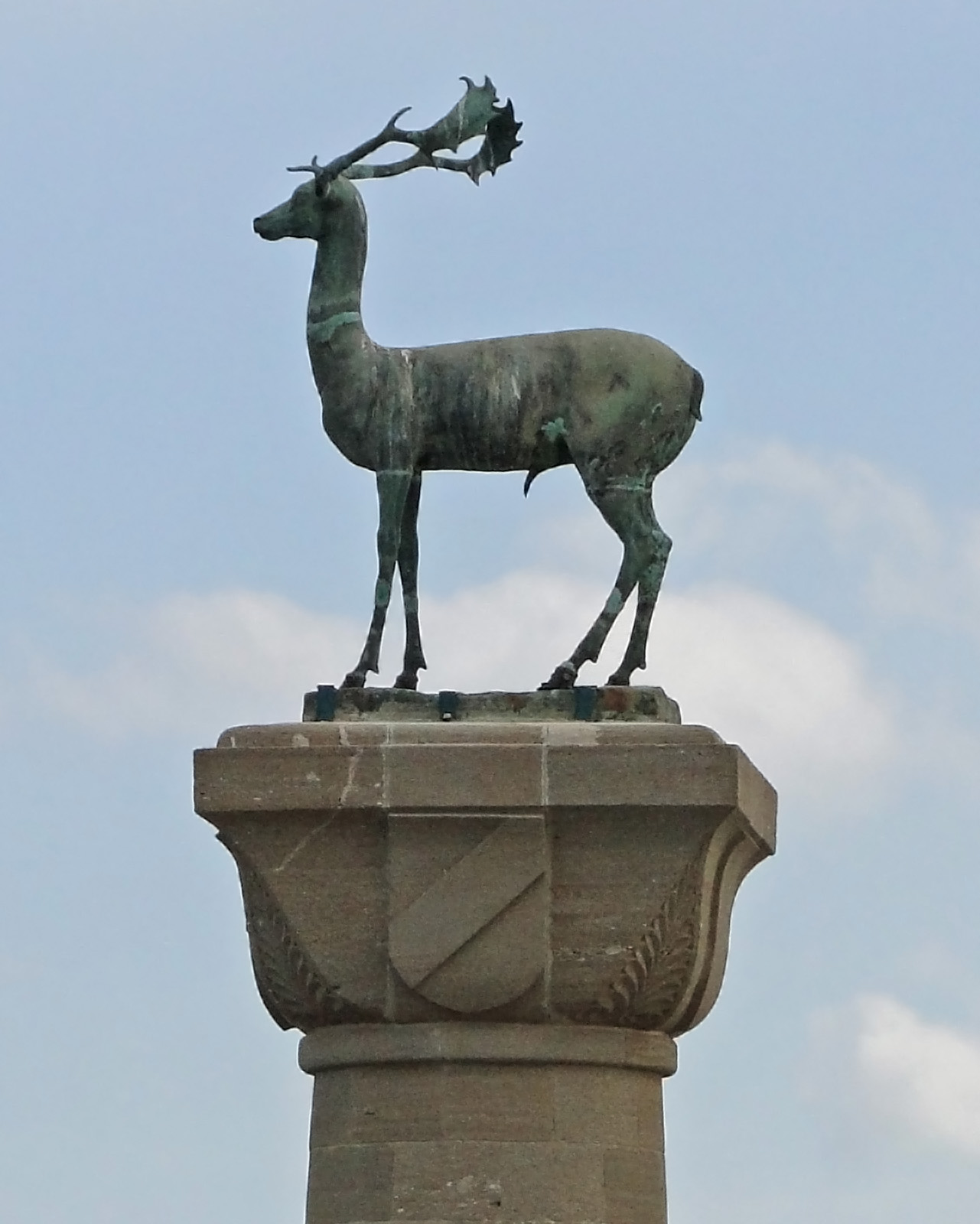
Bronze deer at the harbour

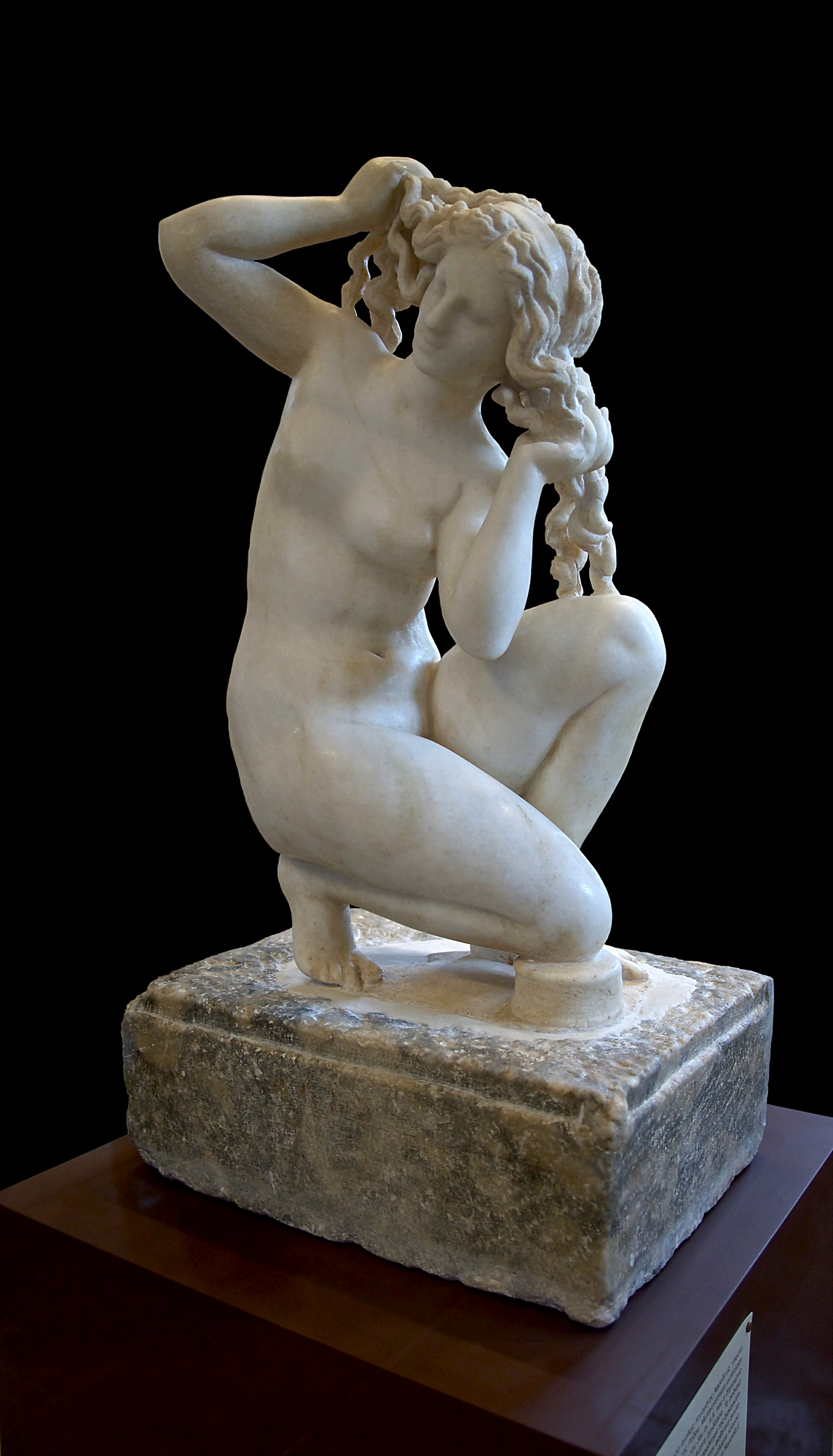
Aphrodite of Rhodes

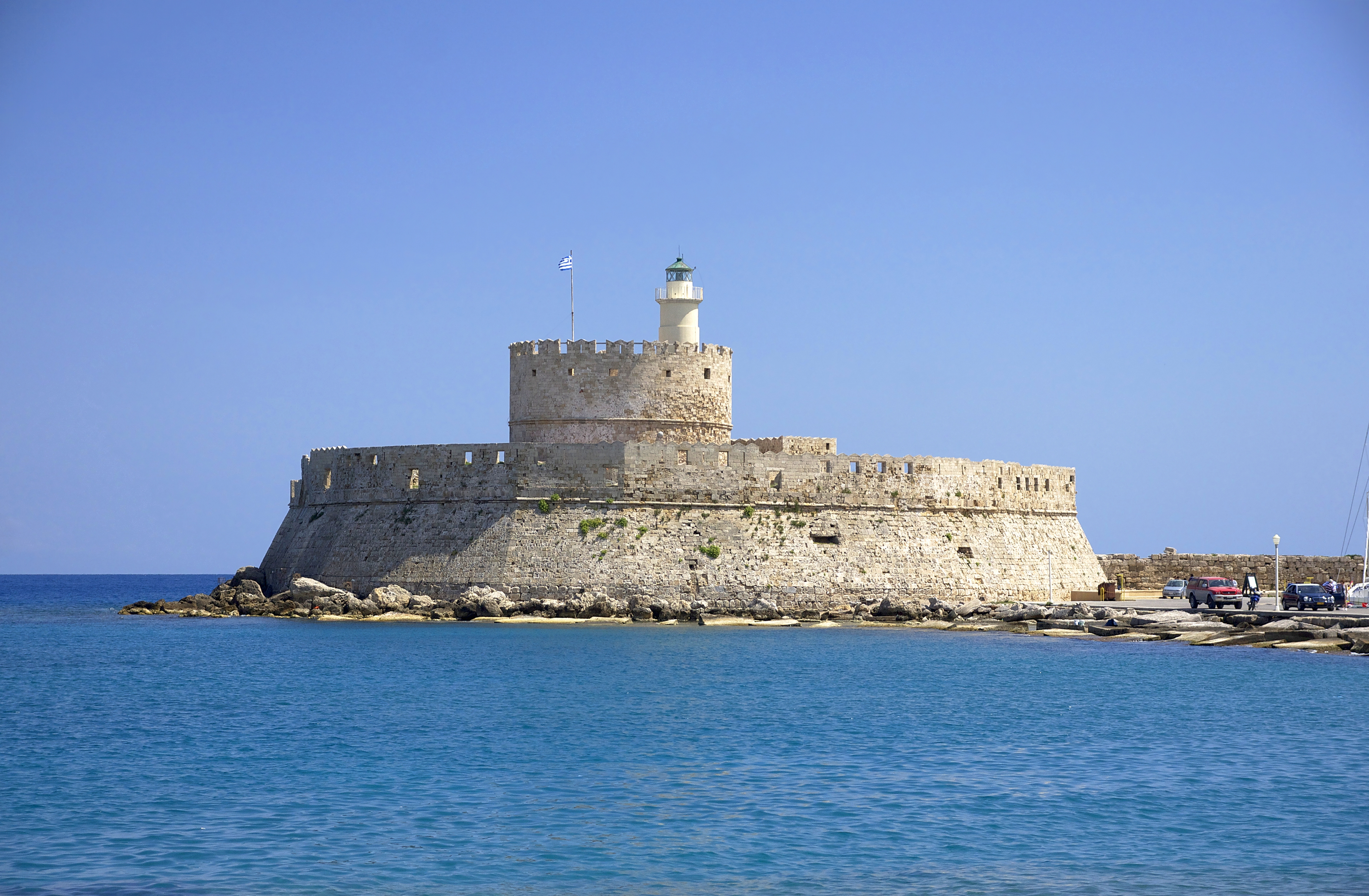
Fort Saint Nicolas

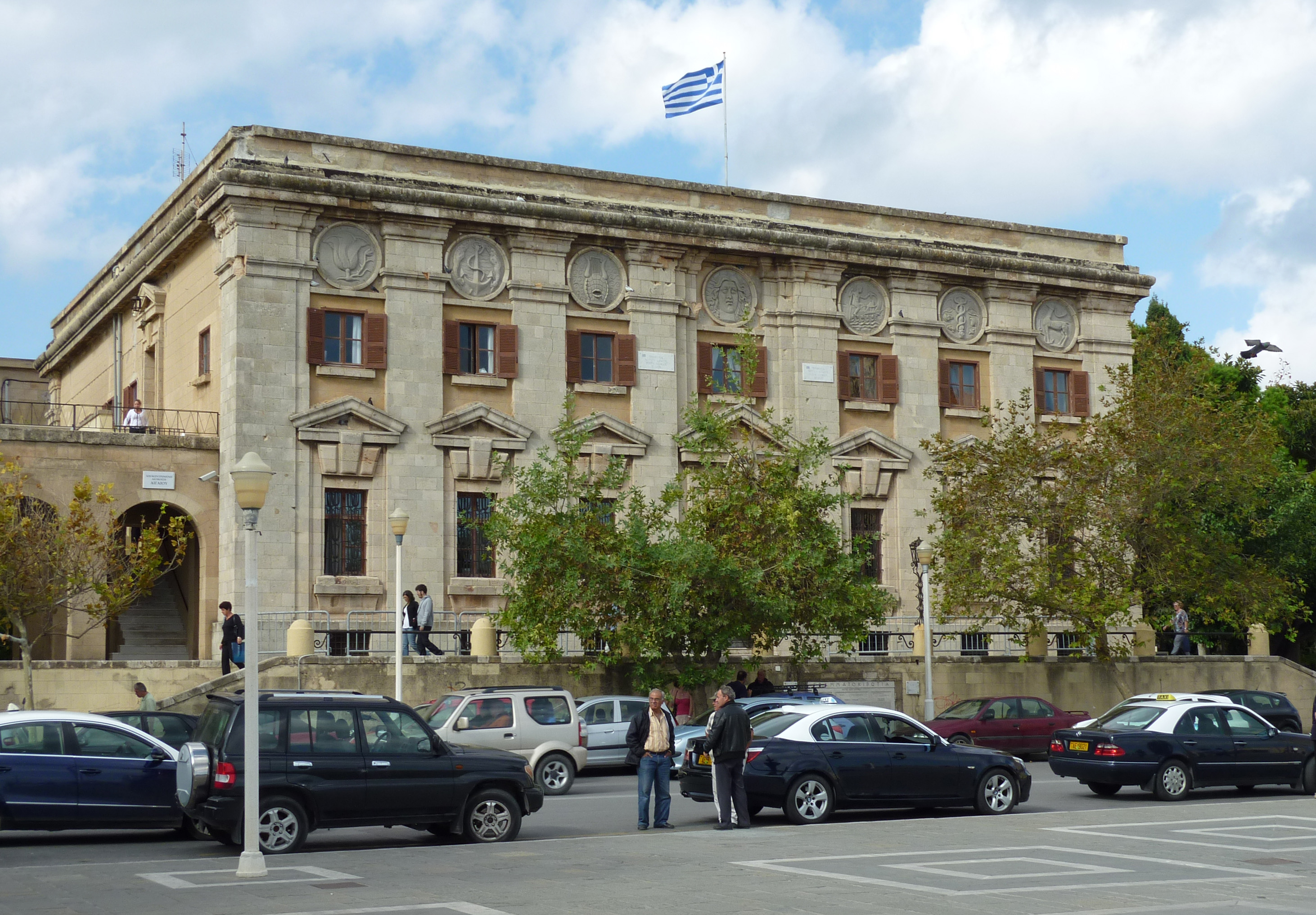
Main post office, by Di Fausto

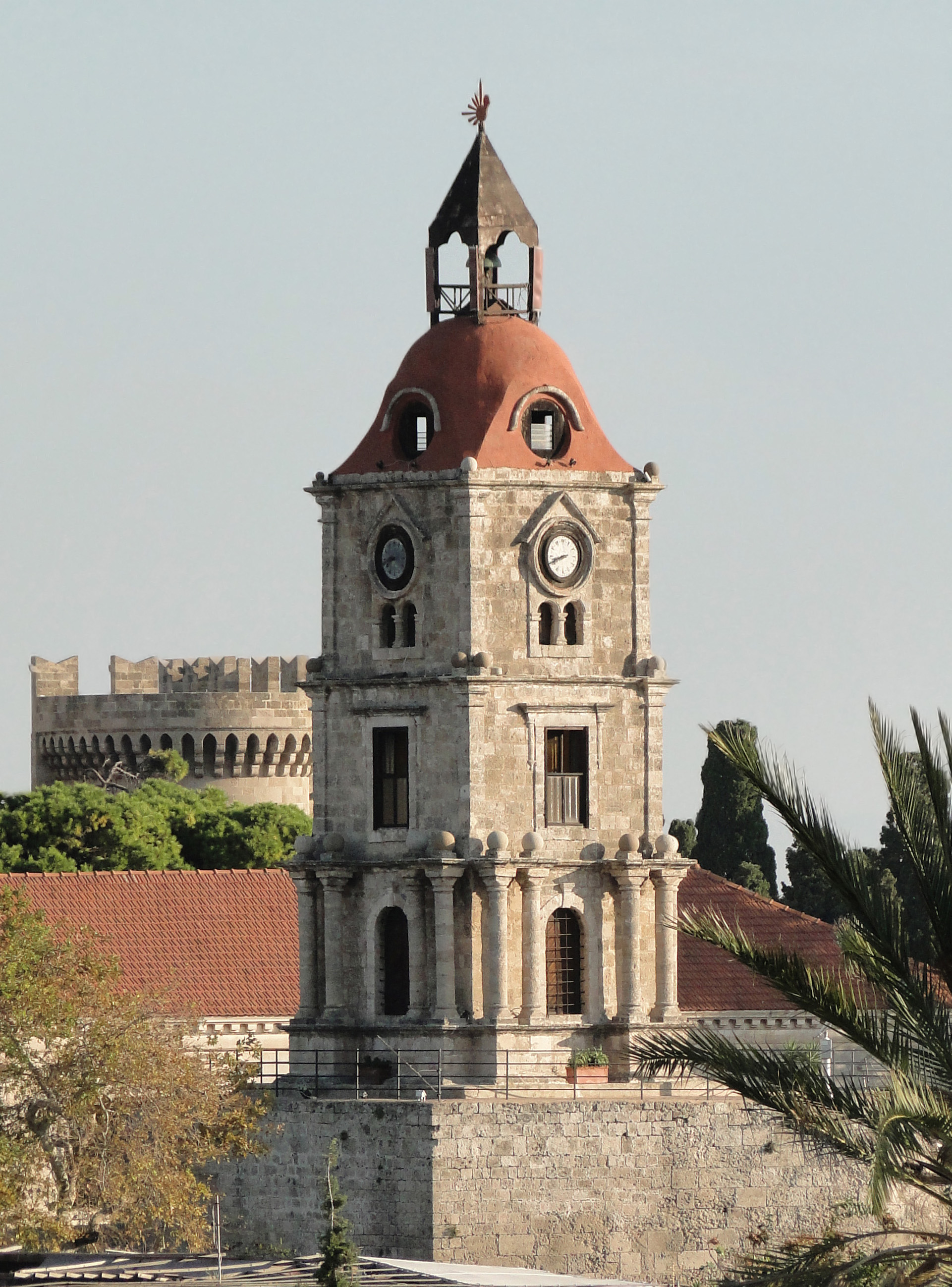
Clocktower

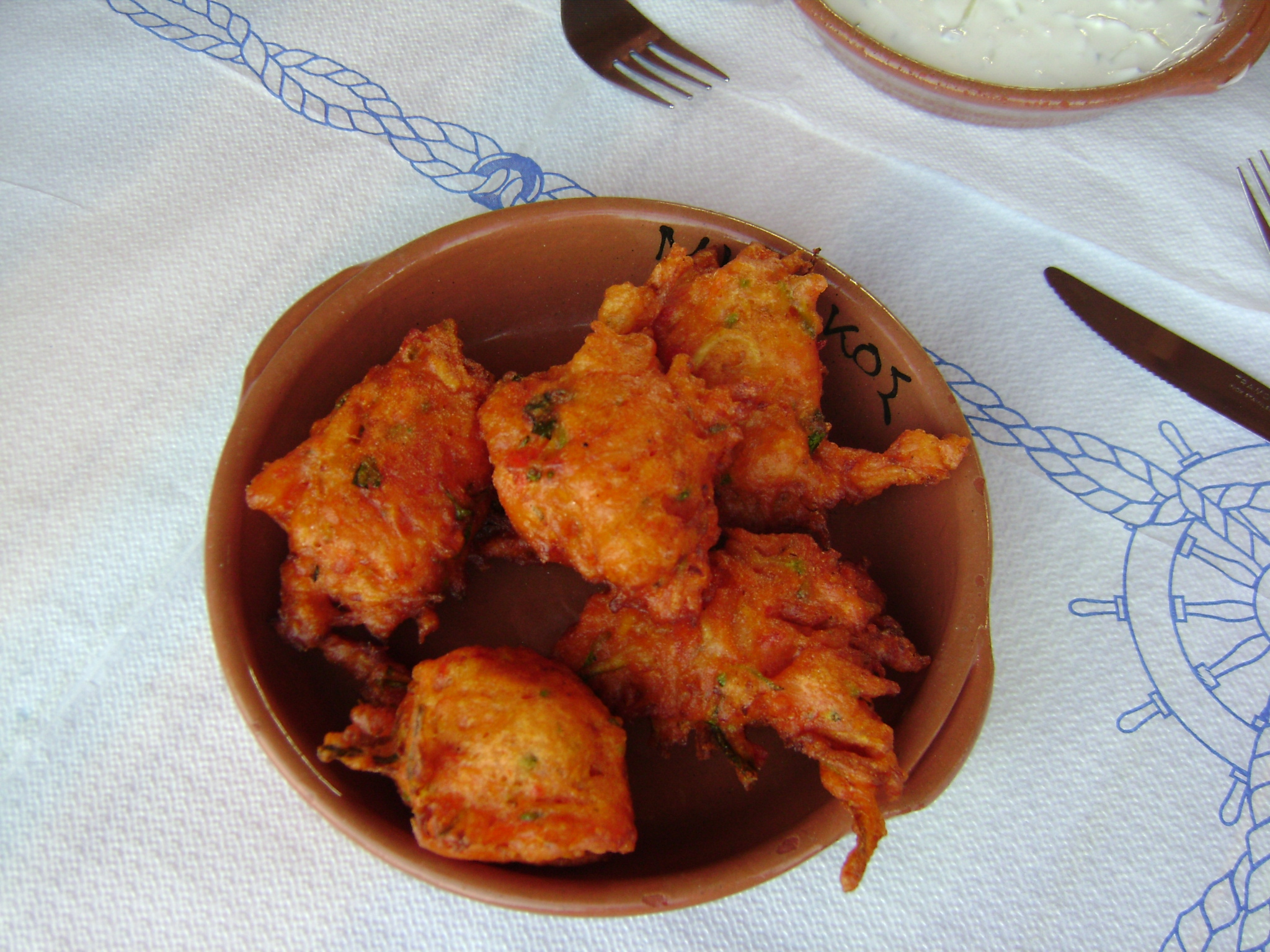
Pitaroudia, traditional food from Rhodes and Dodecanese
