= Koskinou =

Human settlement in Greece

Koskinou Κοσκινού
- Community
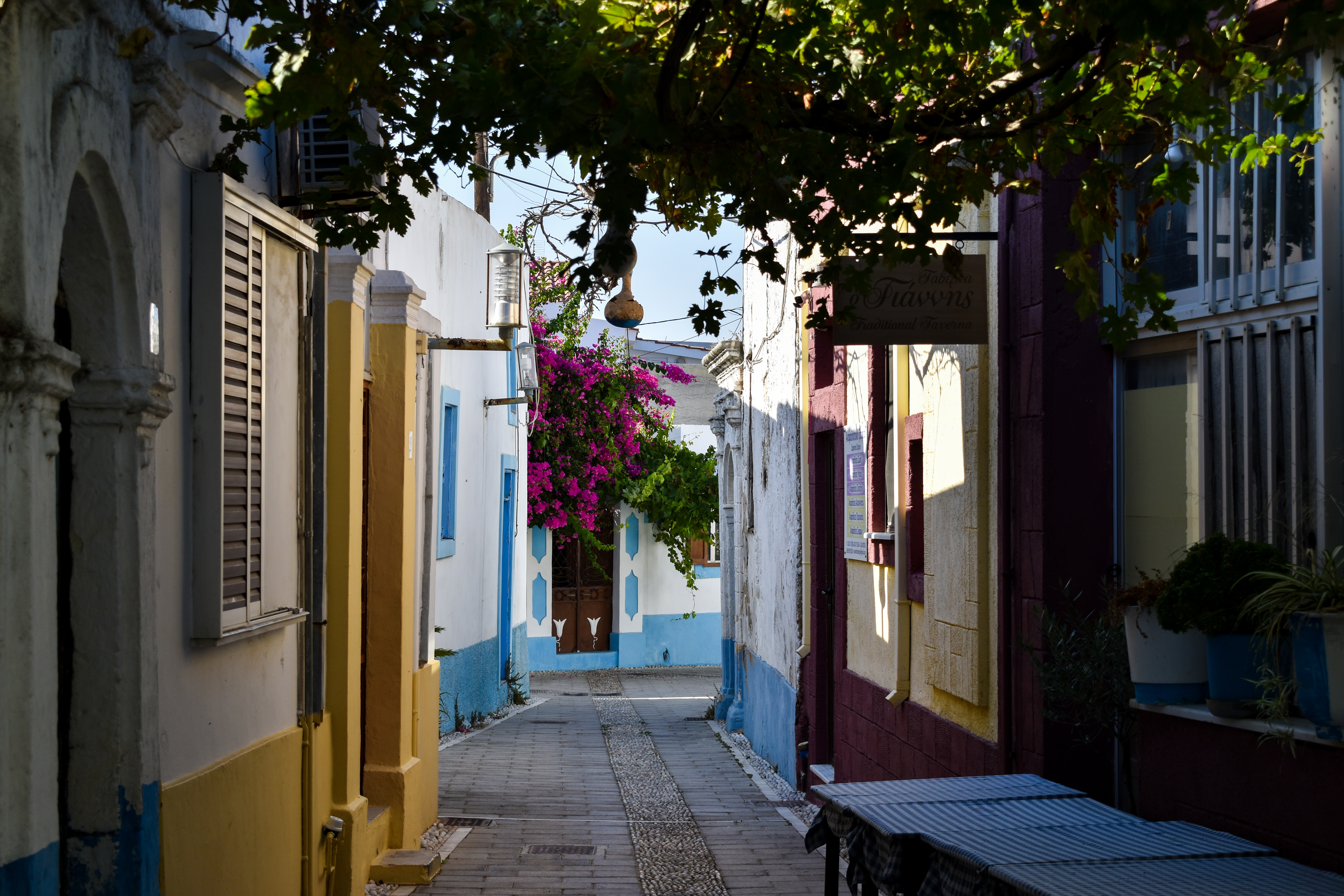
- View from the pergola of a taverna in Koskinou

- Location within Greece
- Coordinates: 36°23′N 28°13′E
- Country: Greece
- Administrative region: South Aegean
- Regional unit: Rhodes
- Municipality: Rhodes
- Municipal unit: Kallithea

Population (2021)
  - Community: 4,948
- Time zone: UTC+2 (EET)
  - Summer (DST): UTC+3 (EEST)

Koskinou (Greek: Κοσκινού) is a village on the Greek island of Rhodes. It is located 5 miles from Rhodes town and 6 miles from the island resort of Faliraki and the Music School of Rhodes.

Koskinou is famous for its unique traditional houses decorated with bright, vibrant colours. There is a major festival on July 17 when the village celebrates the name day of St. Marina with customary music and dancing. The village is part of the Kallithea-Rhodes Municipality. The local football team called Diyenis Koskinou reside in the fourth division of the Greek league.

The Church of the Assumption of the Virgin Mary is a major church of Koskinou. It features a five-tiered bell tower, which is one of Koskinou's tallest buildings.

== Gallery ==
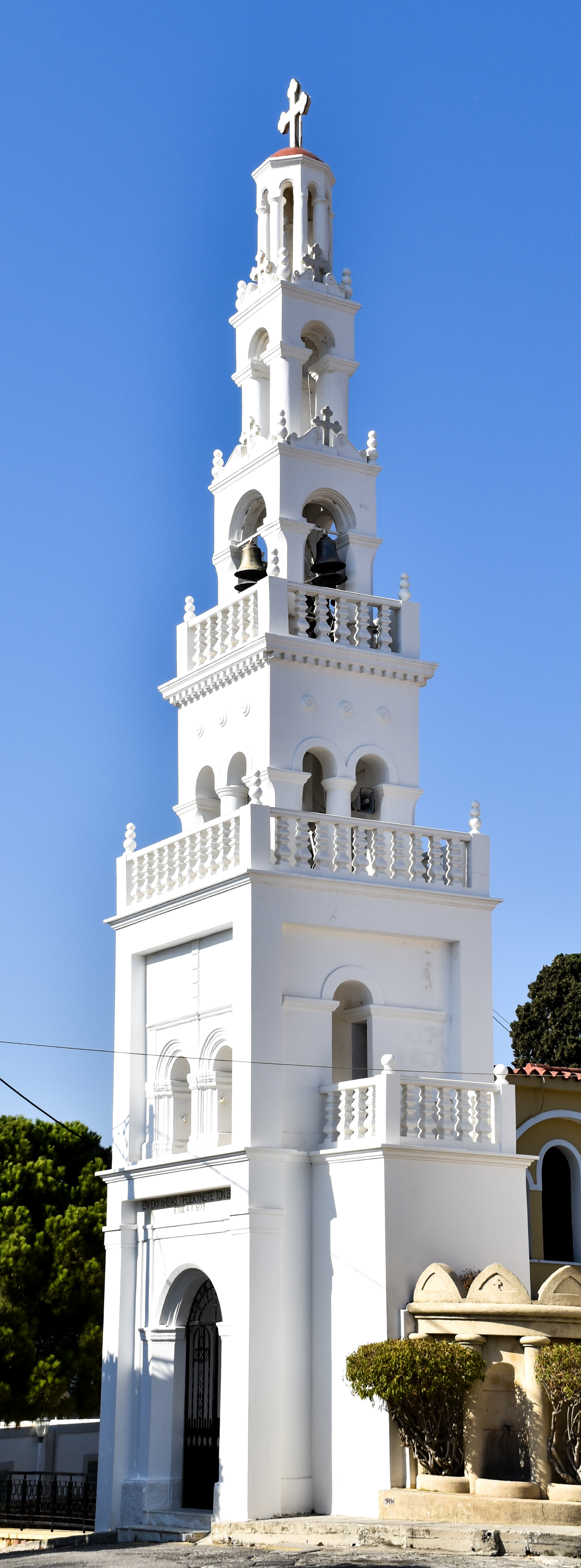
Five-tiered bell tower of the Church of the Assumption of the Virgin Mary

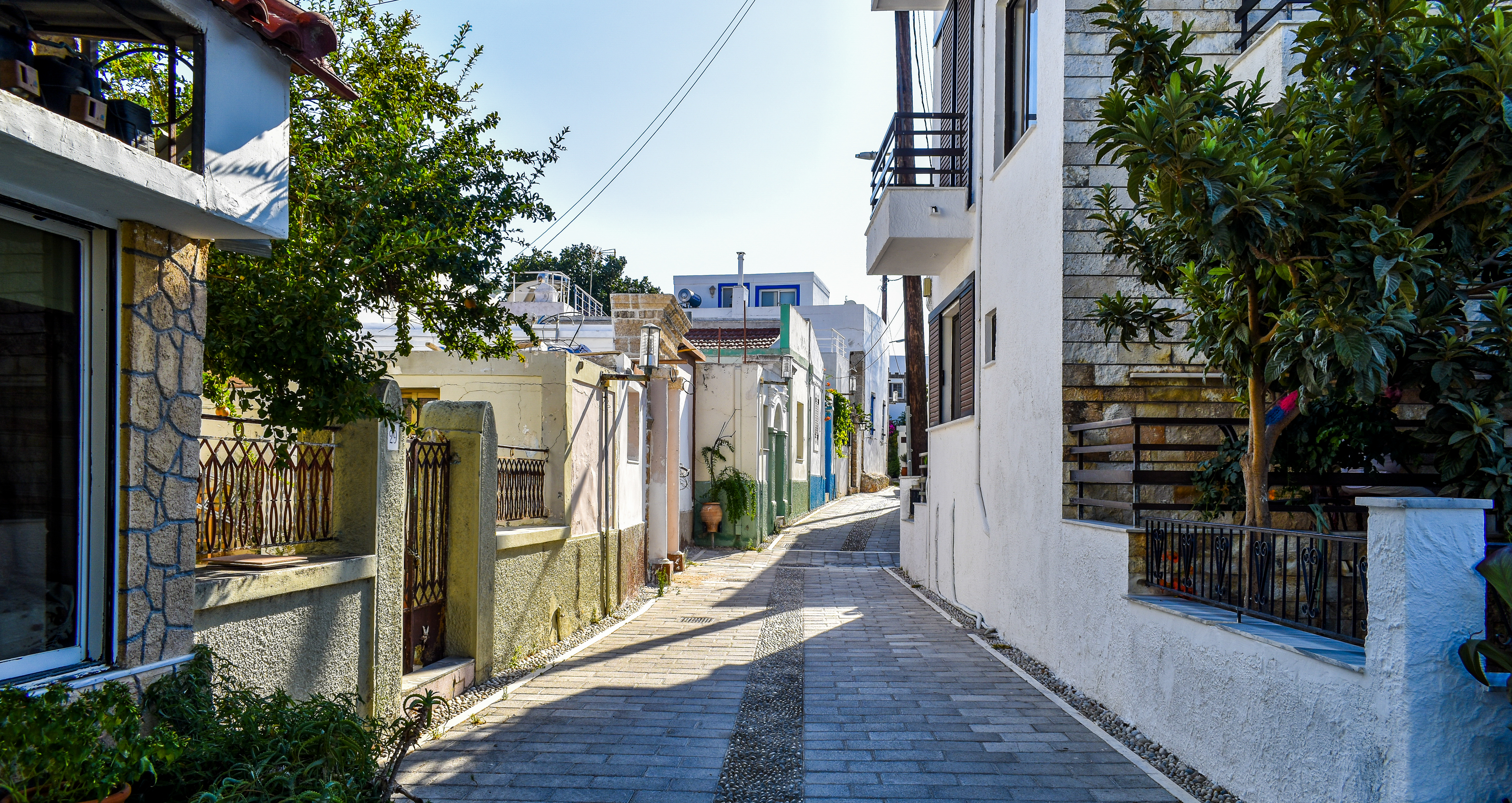
Vaiseleos Pavlou, a major street of Koskinou

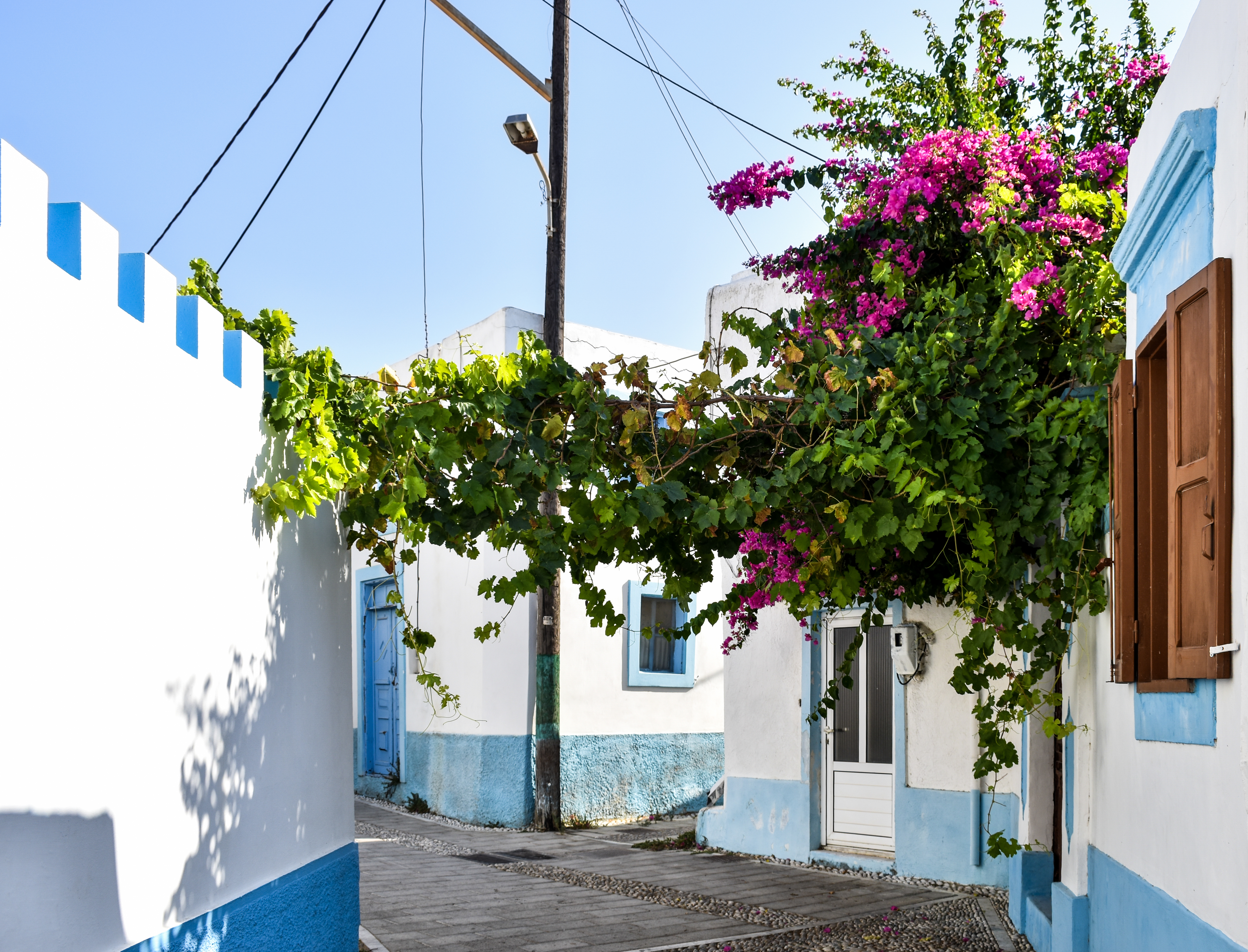
Bougainvillea growing between buildings

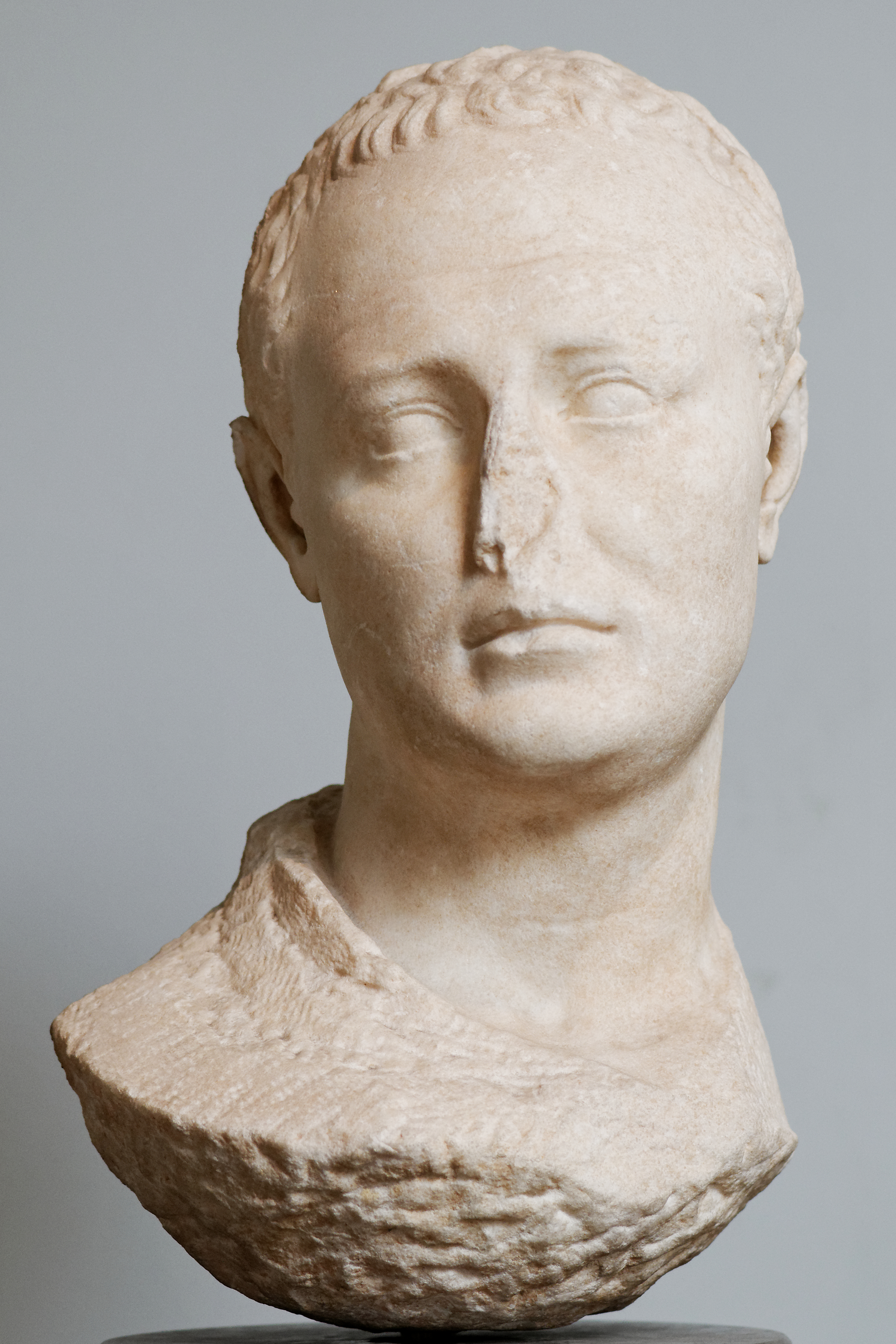
Hellenistic sculpture found at Koskinou
