= Afantou =

Afantou Αφάντου
- Municipal unit
- Location within Rhodes

- Location within Greece
- Coordinates: 36°18′N 28°09′E
- Country: Greece
- Administrative region: South Aegean
- Regional unit: Rhodes
- Municipality: Rhodes

Area
  - Municipal unit: 46.1 km^{2} (17.8 sq mi)

Population (2021)
  - Municipal unit: 7,940
  - Municipal unit density: 172/km^{2} (446/sq mi)
  - Community: 7,291
- Time zone: UTC+2 (EET)
  - Summer (DST): UTC+3 (EEST)

Afantou (Greek: Αφάντου) is a village and a former municipality on the island of Rhodes, in the Dodecanese, Greece. Since the 2011 local government reform it is part of the municipality Rhodes, of which it is a municipal unit. It is situated on the east coast of Rhodes just south of the resort town Faliraki. From a total population of 7,940 (2021 census), 6,936 reside in Afantou town. The only other settlements are the village of Archipoli and the resort Kolympia.

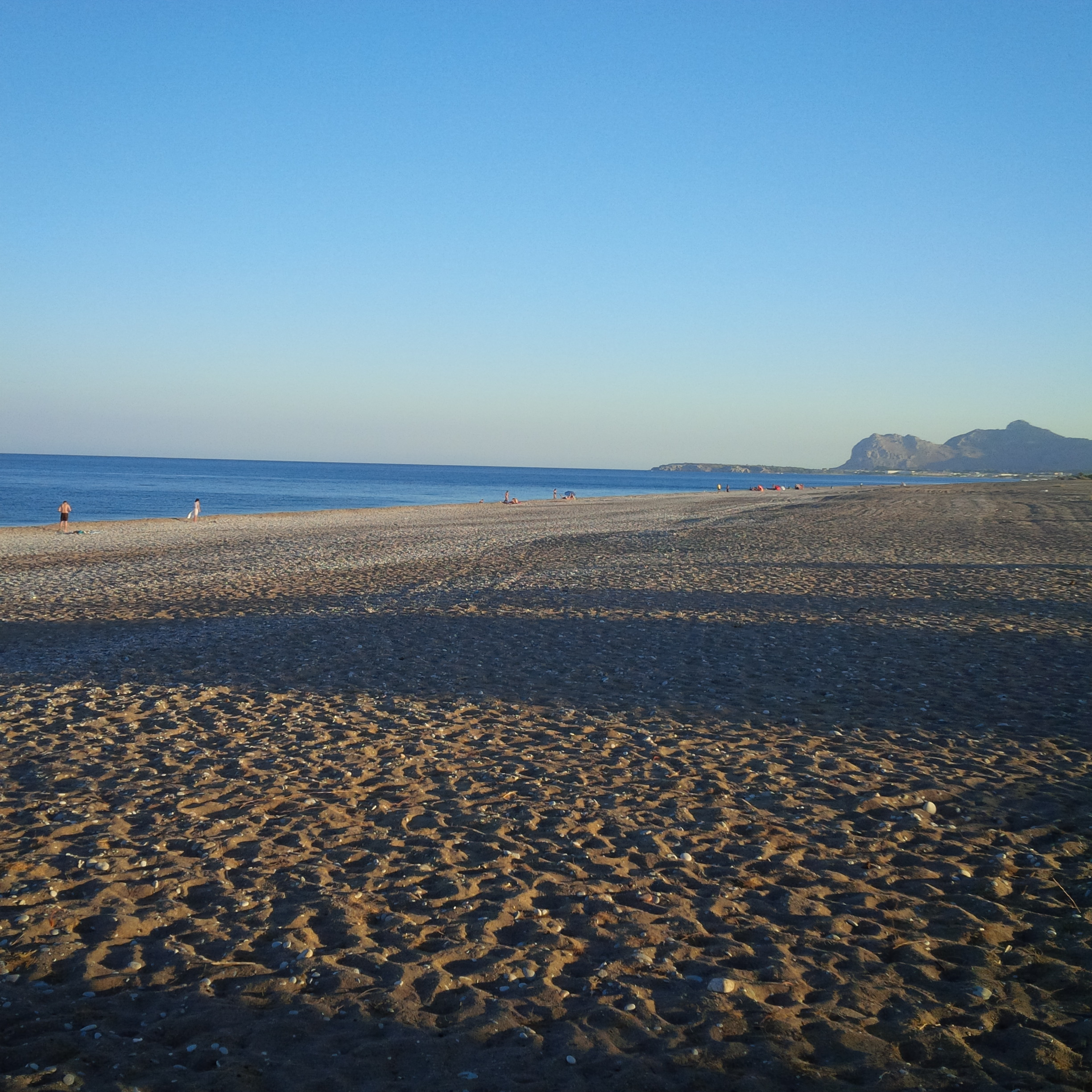
Afantou beach, one of the longest beaches on the island

The municipal unit also hosts the only golf course of the island, the Afantou-Golf, which is next to one of the longest beaches on the island. The municipal unit has a land area of 46.100 km^{2} (17.799 sq mi). In 1996, the Music School of Rhodes (Greece) was transferred from Therme to Afantou due to housing problems for the school whilst it was situated in Therme.
