= Kalythies =

Kalythies Καλυθιές
- Community

- Location within Greece
- Coordinates: 36°20′10″N 28°10′30″E
- Country: Greece
- Administrative region: South Aegean
- Regional unit: Rhodes
- Municipality: Rhodes

Population (2021)
  - Community: 4,739
- Time zone: UTC+2 (EET)
  - Summer (DST): UTC+3 (EEST)

Kalythies (Greek: Καλυθιές) is a village on the island of Rhodes, in the Dodecanese, Greece. Since the 2011 local government reform, it is part of the regional unit of Rhodes. It was also the seat of the municipality of Kallithea.

== Geography ==
Kalythies is located in the northwestern part of the island near Kallithea Bay and Faliraki. It is situated about 13 km (8.1 mi) southwest of the city of Rhodes.

== History ==
The oldest written reference to the village of Kalythies was in 1474 and it was mentioned under the name Calathies or Calaties. Kalythies was named for the calathea plant that thrives in the area. The area of Erimokastro has been declared an archaeological site for the more effective protection of antiquities such as remains of an ancient Hellenistic wall - "Erimokastro", eastern steep slope cave with fossils, furnace remains, remains of a Hellenistic-era building, parts of ancient walls near Ladikos Bay, and remains of ancient tombs at the site of "Traunou".

== Government ==
Kalythies was officially mentioned in 1948, written as Kalythiai, in the Official Gazette 248A - 28/09/1948 to be designated as the seat of the newly founded community of the same name. According to the Kallikratis Programme and its modification by the Kleisthenis I Programme, Kalythies, together with Faliraki, form the community of Kalythies, which belongs to the municipal unit of Kallithea of the municipality of Rhodes. According to the 2021 census, it had 4,739 inhabitants.
