= Damatria =

Village in Greece

Damatria Δαματρία
- Community
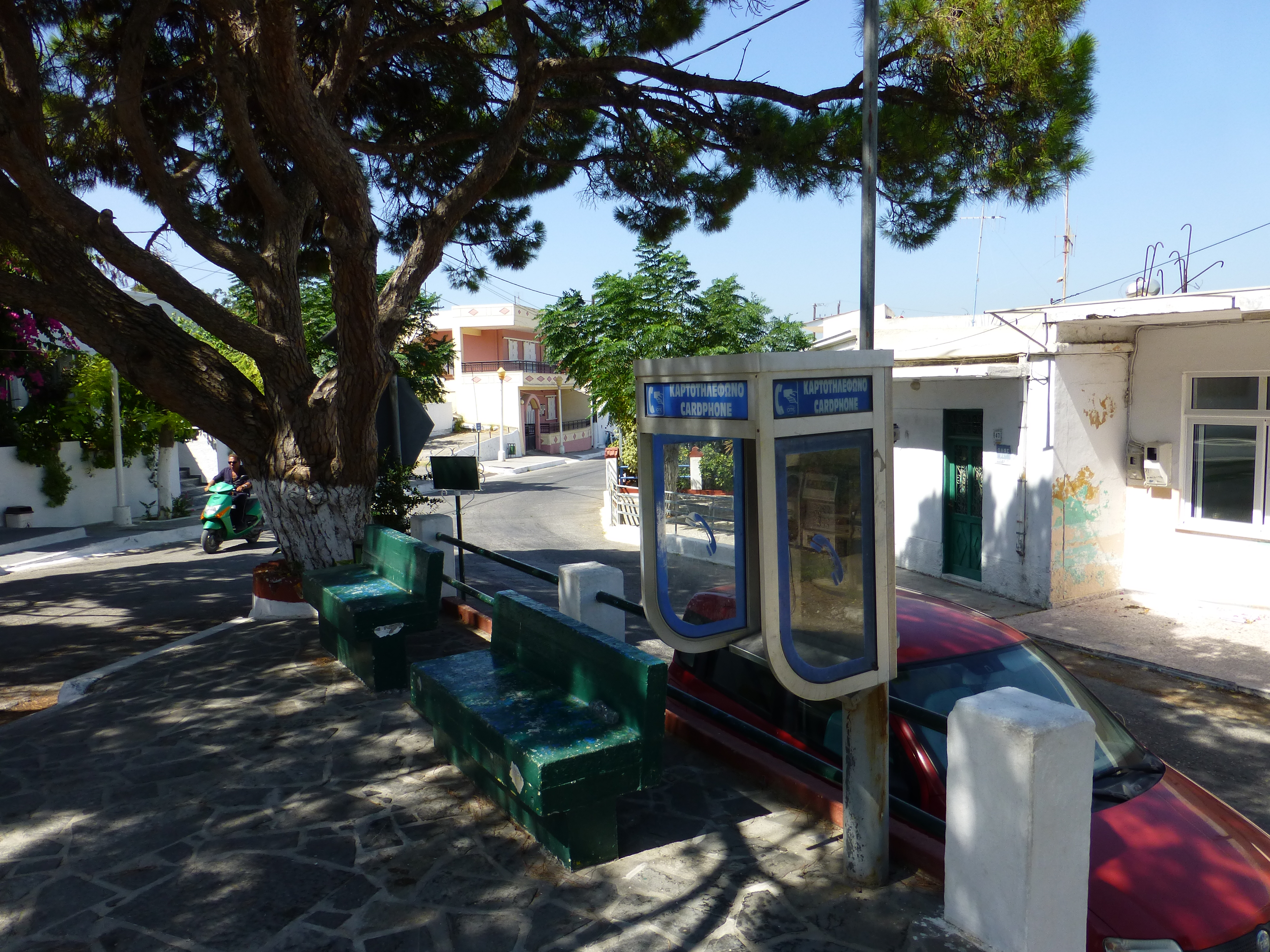

- Location within Greece
- Coordinates: 36°22′48″N 28°04′55″E
- Country: Greece
- Administrative region: South Aegean
- Regional unit: Rhodes
- Municipality: Rhodes
- Municipal unit: Petaloudes

Population (2021)
  - Community: 573
- Time zone: UTC+2 (EET)
  - Summer (DST): UTC+3 (EEST)

Damatria (Greek: Δαματρία) is a village on the Greek island of Rhodes, located on the west coast, about 20 km far from the capital. It is a part of the Municipal unit of Petaloudes. It has a population of 573 people (2021).

Damatria is believed to be the only village of Rhodes dating back to the Doric era in the 11th century BC. Excavations in the surrounding area have confirmed continuous habitation for over 3,000 years. Historians believe this ancient settlement was actually named after the sanctuary of the Goddess Dimitra that had been built in the area.

Most of the settlement is traditional, bar a few exceptions of scattered modern, multi-level homes.

There are natural springs located within the village

There is also a Second World War memorial in the form of the Italian headquarters, as well as historic churches and a number of ancient ruins and sites.
