= Alimia =

Greek island in the Aegean Sea

Alimia Αλιμιά
- Settlement
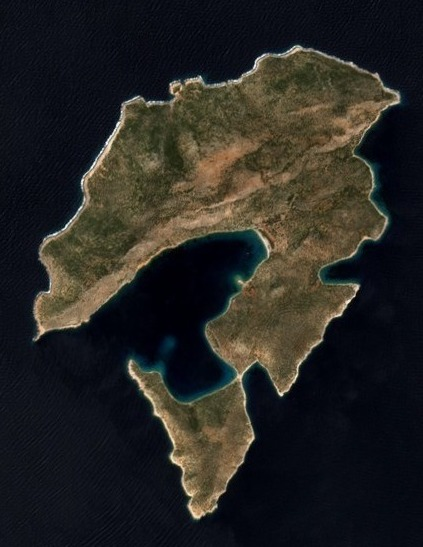
- Alimia

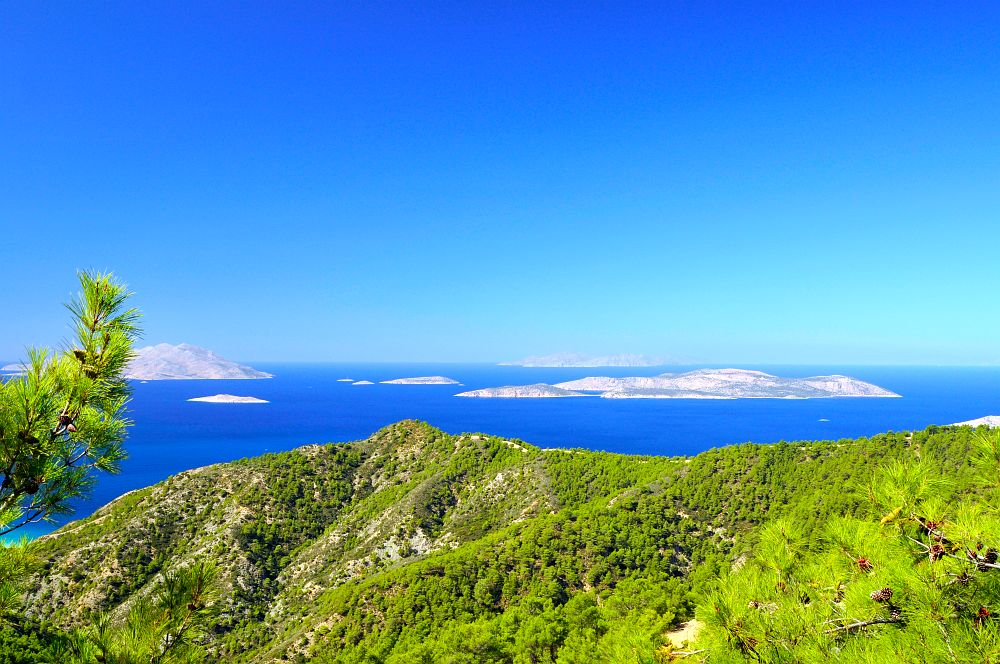

- Location within Greece
- Coordinates: 36°16′N 27°42′E
- Country: Greece
- Administrative region: South Aegean
- Regional unit: Rhodes
- Municipality: Chalki
- Highest elevation: 274 m (899 ft)
- Lowest elevation: 0 m (0 ft)

Population (2021)
  - Total: 0
- Time zone: UTC+2 (EET)
  - Summer (DST): UTC+3 (EEST)

Alimia (Greek: Αλιμιά) or Alimnia (Αλιμνιά) is a Greek island of the Aegean Sea, located in the sea area between Rhodes and Halki, in the complex of the Dodecanese. The surface of the island is 7.4 square kilometres (2.9 square miles) and it has a coastline of 21 kilometres (13 miles). The island had a small population until the period of the Second World War, and in recent decades has remained uninhabited.

The island is mentioned in ancient texts as Eulimna (Ancient Greek: Εὔλιμνα) and by Pliny the Elder under the name Evlimnia and associated with two large bays of the island, Emporio and Saint George, in the eastern and western side of the island that are safe natural harbors. Their use in antiquity is confirmed by the impressive, carved into the rock, dockyards, dating to the Hellenistic period when it belonged to the Rhodian state. In the Hellenistic period, flourished when the Rhodian state, the island was fortified with the construction of the fortress and used as anchorage and observatory for the Rhodian fleet. The Hellenistic castle survived until today in the highest peak east of the island. A department of a Hellenistic castle was used for the construction of a medieval castle in 1475, when Rhodes and its surrounding islands were occupied by the Knights Hospitaller. On the coast of Emporio found Roman tombs and visible ancient walls and the foundation of an early Christian basilica.

The settlement of Alimia is built deep in the largest bay on the island. It includes several buildings, most of which are dilapidated due to the abandonment of the settlement from the 1940s. Although abandoned, the settlement has declared traditional since 1978. Northwest of the village, a short distance from the coast there is a small lake with salty water, which is one of the 37 natural wetlands in the Dodecanese.

In October 2016 a Belgian organization called 'Beyond Borders Belgium' dropped 20 people on this uninhabited island. The participants had to survive 10 days with hardly any food or equipment. Personal belongings like a cellphone, mattress or clean cloths were not allowed. Each day the participants had to play a game on the island to earn points. At the end of the "vacation" the participant with the most points wins the challenge. The game is based on a former Belgian TV-format called 'Expeditie Robinson'. The Greek government agreed with this concept and gave Beyond Borders Belgium exclusive rights of the island for the full period of 10 days.
