= Paradeisi =

Paradeisi Παραδείσι
- Community
- Location within Greece
- Coordinates: 36°24′00″N 28°04′59″E
- Country: Greece
- Administrative region: South Aegean
- Regional unit: Rhodes
- Municipality: Rhodes
- Municipal unit: Petaloudes

Population (2021)
  - Community: 2,623
- Time zone: UTC+2 (EET)
  - Summer (DST): UTC+3 (EEST)

Paradeisi (Greek: Παραδείσι) is a village on the northern coast of the island of Rhodes, Greece. It has a population of 2,623 inhabitants (2021 census) and is the second-largest town (after Kremasti) in the municipal unit of Petaloudes.

The island's main airport (Diagoras International Airport, IATA code: RHO) is located here.

== History ==
During the period of the Saint John Knights occupation of the island, the magister Villeneuve made a castle in order to protect the northeastern part of the island from pirate raids. People started building around the castle. Later, Arab inhabitants brought exotic flowers and planted them along the village mountain making it look as paradise, hence the name Paradeisi. After the Italian occupation, they renamed the village to Villanova only to be changed again to Paradeisi after it was reclaimed by Greece.

== Culture ==
Strawberry festival is celebrated every year, the first Sunday of May, including strawberry fruit and products from producers of Paradeisi, Music and events. The feast of Saint Marina is celebrated on the 17th of July every year.
