= Maritsa, Rhodes =

Maritsa Μαριτσά
- Community
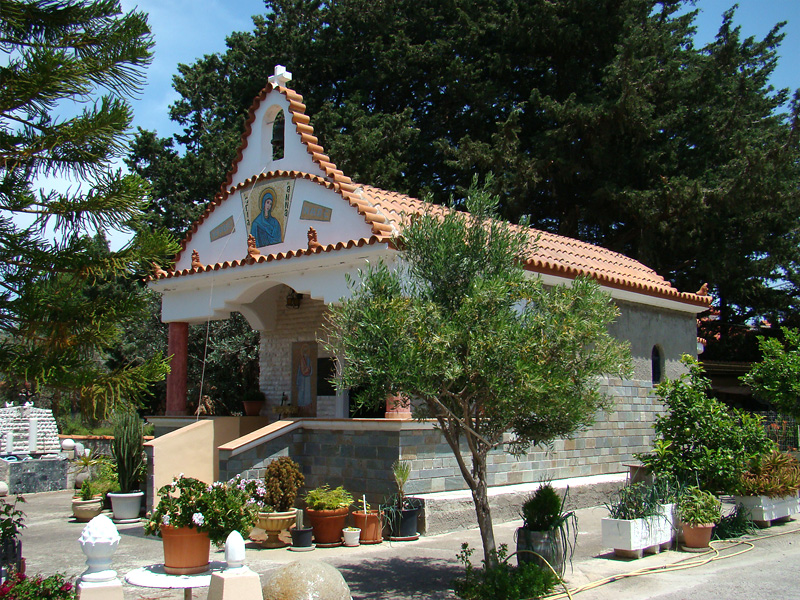
- Church of Agia Anna

- Location within Greece
- Coordinates: 36°21′40″N 28°07′01″E
- Country: Greece
- Administrative region: South Aegean
- Regional unit: Rhodes
- Municipality: Rhodes
- Municipal unit: Petaloudes

Population (2021)
  - Community: 1,841
- Time zone: UTC+2 (EET)
  - Summer (DST): UTC+3 (EEST)

Maritsa (Greek: Μαριτσά) is a village situated on west coast of the island of Rhodes, Greece, about 17 km (11 mi) far from the capital, between Kremasti and Psinthos. It is a part of the Municipality of Petaloudes. This village is renowned for its traditional taverns and active nightlife all year round. Near the village at the old international airport, car and motorbike races are held as well as model airplane shows. Outside the village, there are two churches: the Agios Georgios church, built in the 15th century and the Agios Nikolaos church, with wall paintings from the 15th century.

Maritsa is also home to Iraklis AKS, a sports club with senior and junior teams competing at regional level. Iraklis football club also has experience playing for a year in the late 1990s in the then 4th National division.

Maritsa is renowned for its hospitable inhabitants and traditional character, it is the only village in Rhodes without a seasonal hotel, though studio apartments are available upon request.

Every December all the young people organise a celebration for welcoming the new year at the centre square of the village. The money needed for the celebration is an offer from the villagers and the owners of the restaurants and bars. The ceremony takes place at about 19:00 of 31 December and 3 hrs later the party is "fired up" by a group playing local songs and dances performed by instruments like lyra and bouzouki. At the same period α live crib is opened where represents the birth of Christ with genuine animals, horses and goats. The crib is found in the top of Mt. Koymoyli, next to the holily abbey of transformation of Savior Christ. At the crib is offered hot tea from locally herbs as well as traditional rusk while the small children can come out photographs with Santa Claus. The crib functions from 24 December until 6 January.

The village has taken his name from an Italian officer called "Maritza" that had the responsibility for the control of the village at the duration of Italian possession. Today it numbers about 1800 residents.
