= Rhodes Air Base =

Rhodes Maritsa Airport Αερολιμένας Ρόδου - Μαριτσών
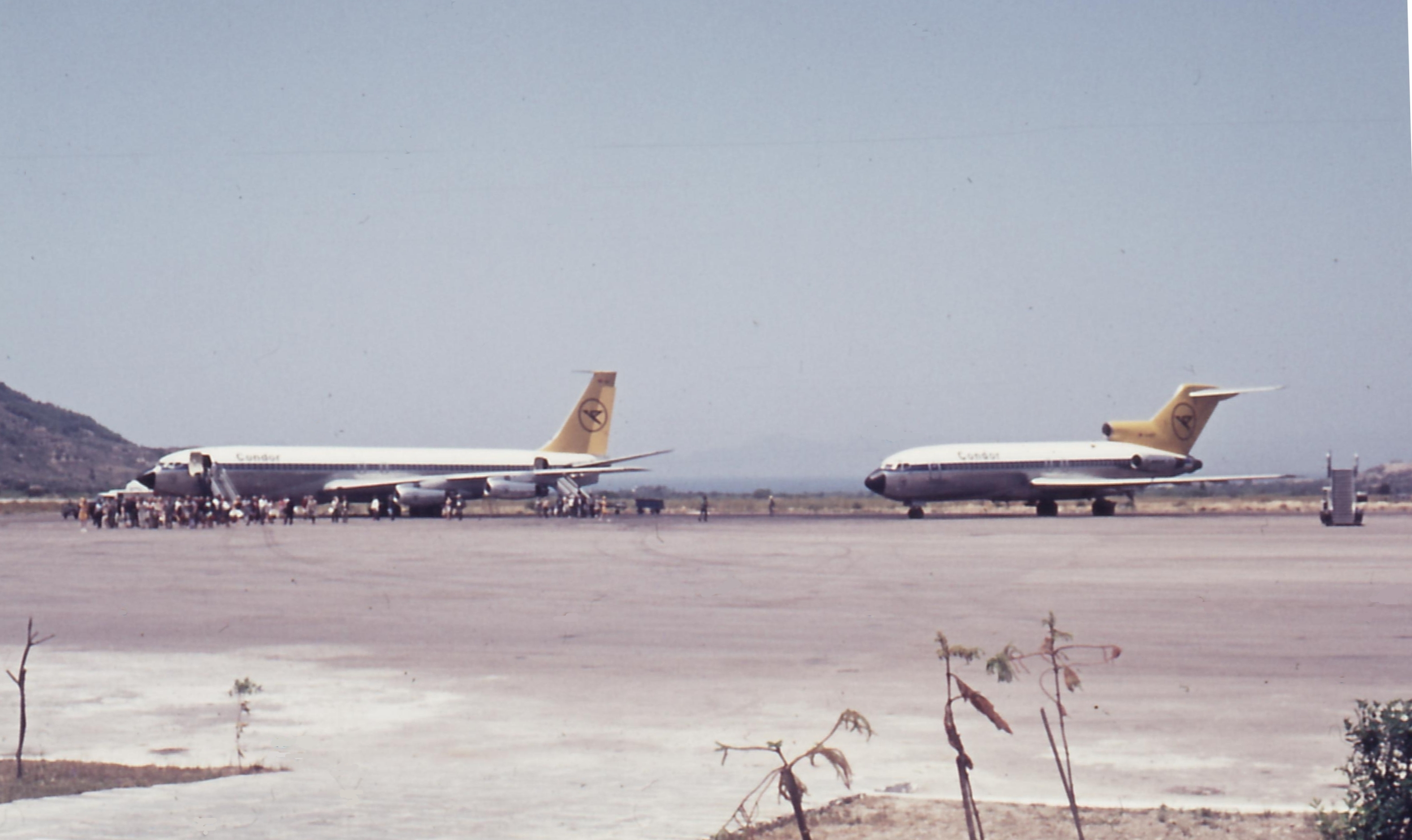
- The airport in 1972

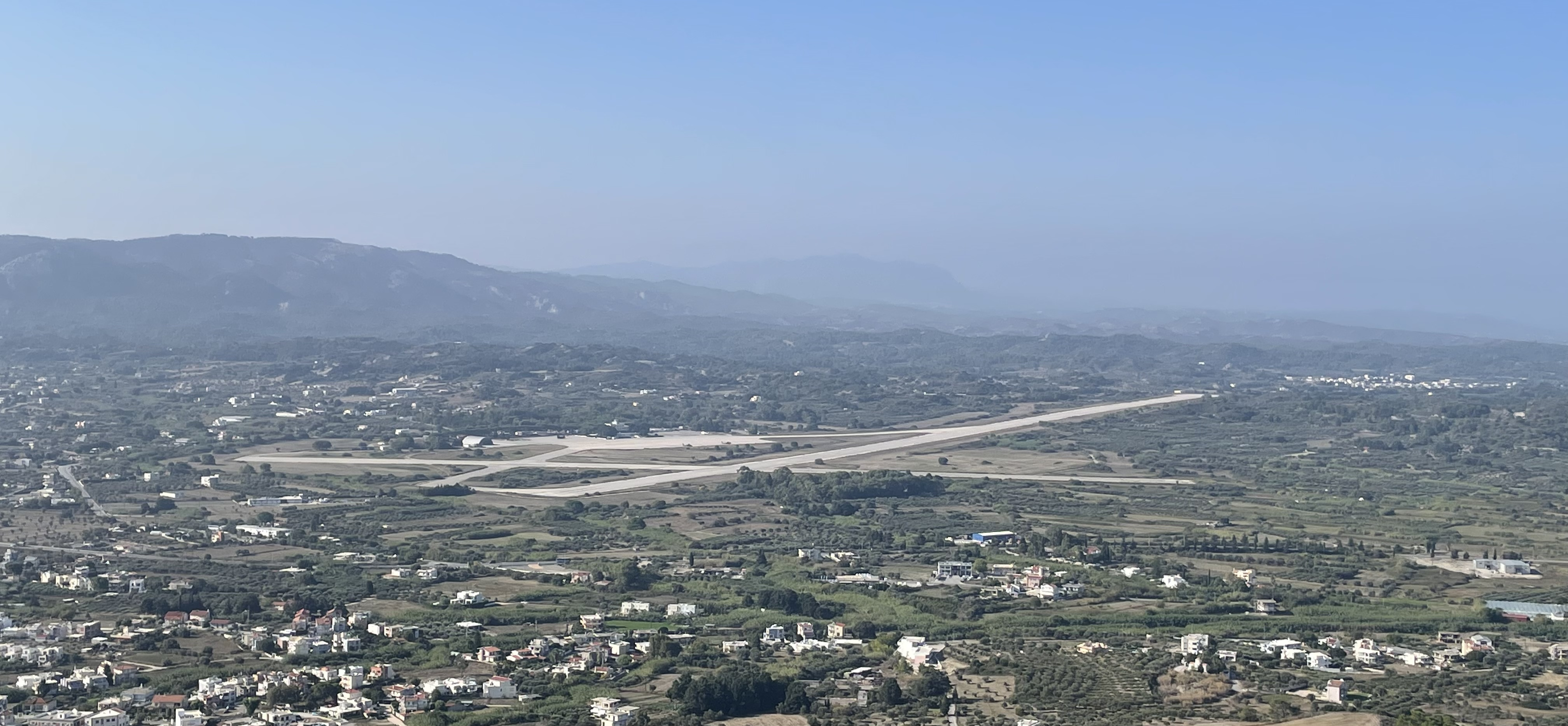
- Aerial view of Rhodes Maritsa Airport
- IATA: none; ICAO: LGRD

Summary
- Airport type: Military
- Location: Maritsa, Rhodes, South Aegean, Greece
- Elevation AMSL: 204 ft (62 m)
- Coordinates: 36°23′04″N 028°07′04″E

Map
- Location of airport in Greece

Runways
Direction	Length		Surface
Direction	m	ft	Surface
08/26	2,400	7,874	Asphalt
14/32	1,200	3,937	Asphalt
- Source: DAFIF

Rhodes Maritsa Airport (Greek: Αερολιμένας Ρόδου - Μαριτσών) (IATA: LGRD) is a military air base located on the island of Rhodes in Greece. The airport is located 14 km south west of the capital city of Rhodes, near the village of Maritsa, and 3 km south of the newer Rhodes International Airport.

== History ==
The airport was built in 1938 during the Italian occupation of the Dodecanese as a base for the Regia Aeronautica and was called Aeroporto di Martisa "G.Pessi Parvis" and its Italian airport code was 801. It housed a squadron of Savoia-Marchetti SM.81 and a squadron of Fiat CR.32 biplane fighters. In 1940, during World War II, it was bombed by the British Royal Air Force but stayed under Italian control until the Dodecanese Campaign, when it fell under German control.

In September 1942 it was a target, along with the Italian airfield at Kalathos, of Operation Anglo. This was a combined British and Greek Commando operation which successfully destroyed at least 20 Italian aircraft at Maritsa.

After the war, it became the main airport for the island until 1977, when the new Rhodes International Airport was opened.

== Current Use ==
Since the opening of Rhodes International Airport, Maritsa Airport has been used as a base for the Hellenic Air Force hosting permanently a SAR Super Puma helicopter as well a CH-47 Chinook. More recently two Boeing AH-64 Apache helicopters have been based at the airfield, reflecting tensions arising from the long running Aegean dispute with Turkey over the status of the Dodecanese islands.

During the summer a fire bombing helicopter is also hosted, supplemented in 2022 by two Air Tractor AT-802F Fire Boss Amphibious Scooper Air Tankers..

On 13 July 2022 a Mil Mi-8 firefighting helicopter based at Maritsa flew to Samos to support firefighting efforts on the island. It crashed into the sea off Samos with the loss of two crew members.

The airport runway has also been used by local clubs for car and motorbike races, mostly off season.
