= Halki (Greece) =

Greek island in the Aegean Sea

Halki Χάλκη
- Municipality
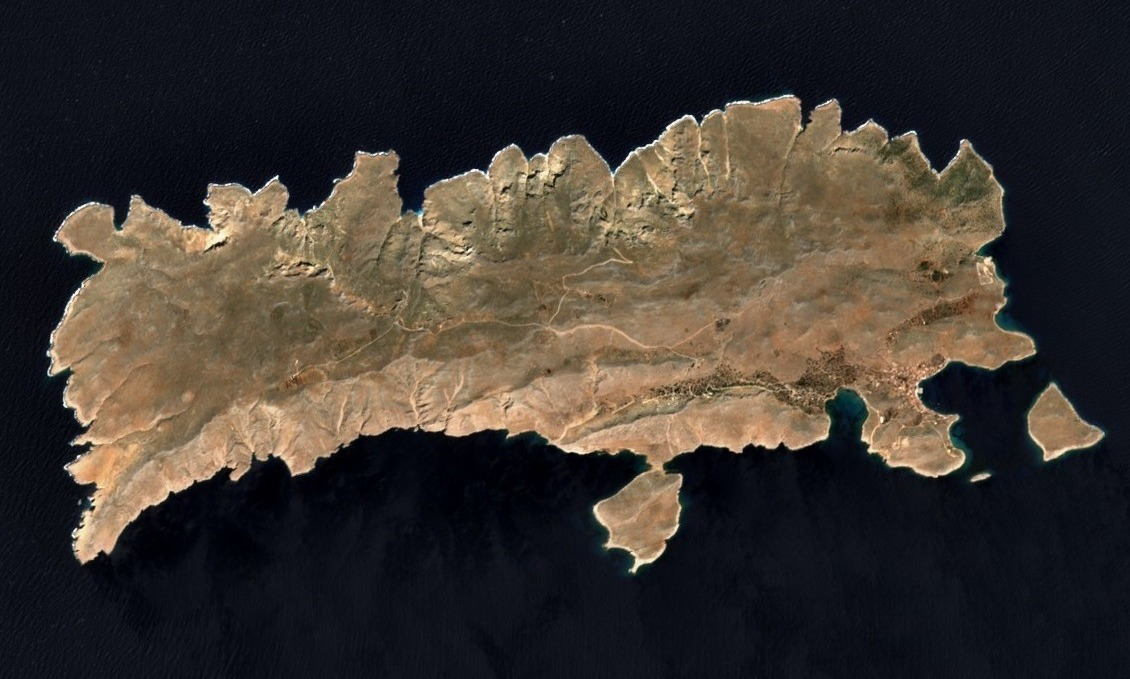
- Satellite image of the island

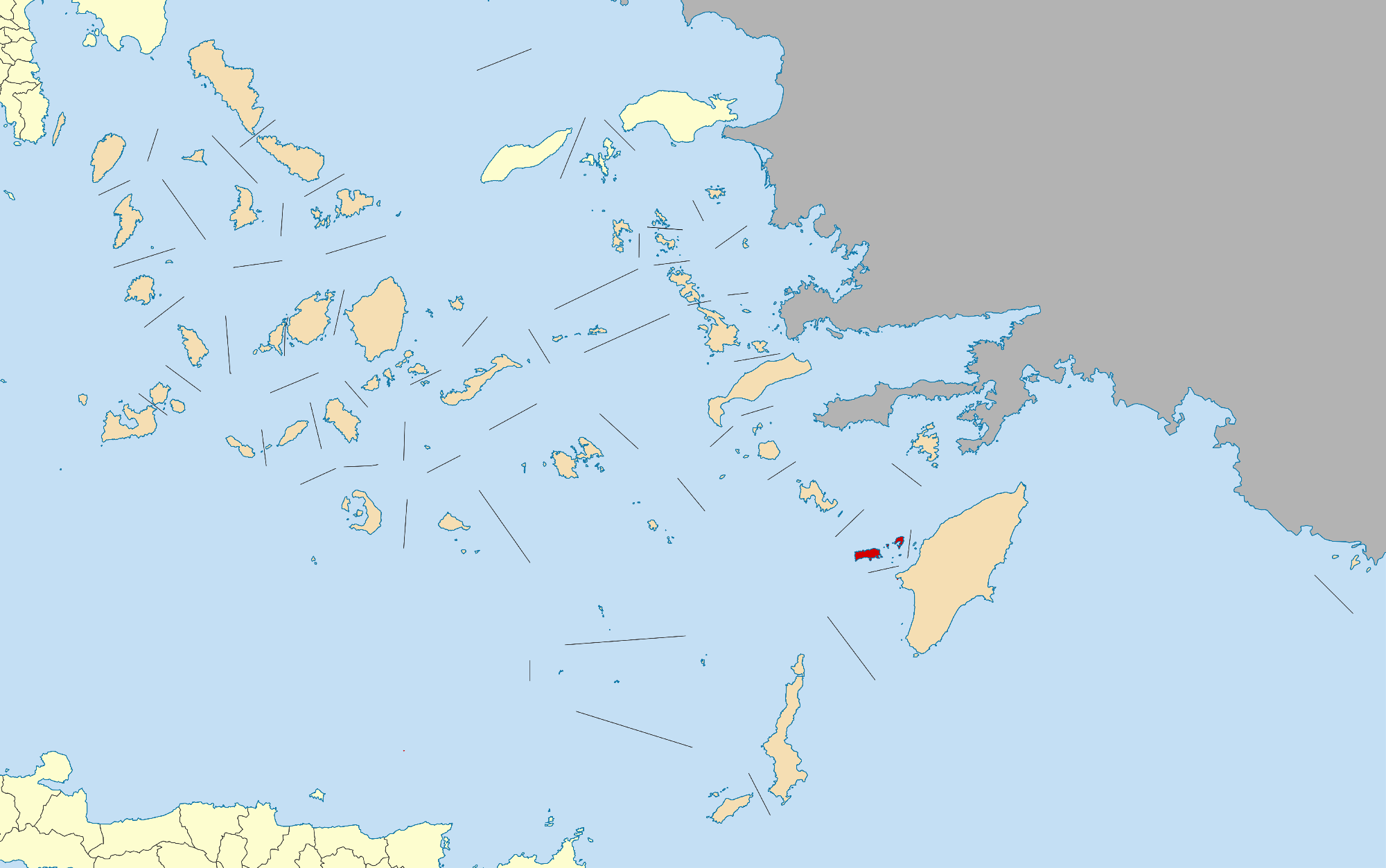

- Location within Greece
- Coordinates: 36°14′N 27°34′E
- Country: Greece
- Administrative region: South Aegean
- Regional unit: Rhodes

Area
  - Municipality: 37.04 km^{2} (14.30 sq mi)
- Highest elevation: 601 m (1,972 ft)
- Lowest elevation: 0 m (0 ft)

Population (2021)
  - Municipality: 475
  - Density: 12.8/km^{2} (33.2/sq mi)
- Time zone: UTC+2 (EET)
  - Summer (DST): UTC+3 (EEST)
- Postal code: 851 10
- Area code: 22460
- Vehicle registration: ΚΧ, ΡΟ, ΡΚ

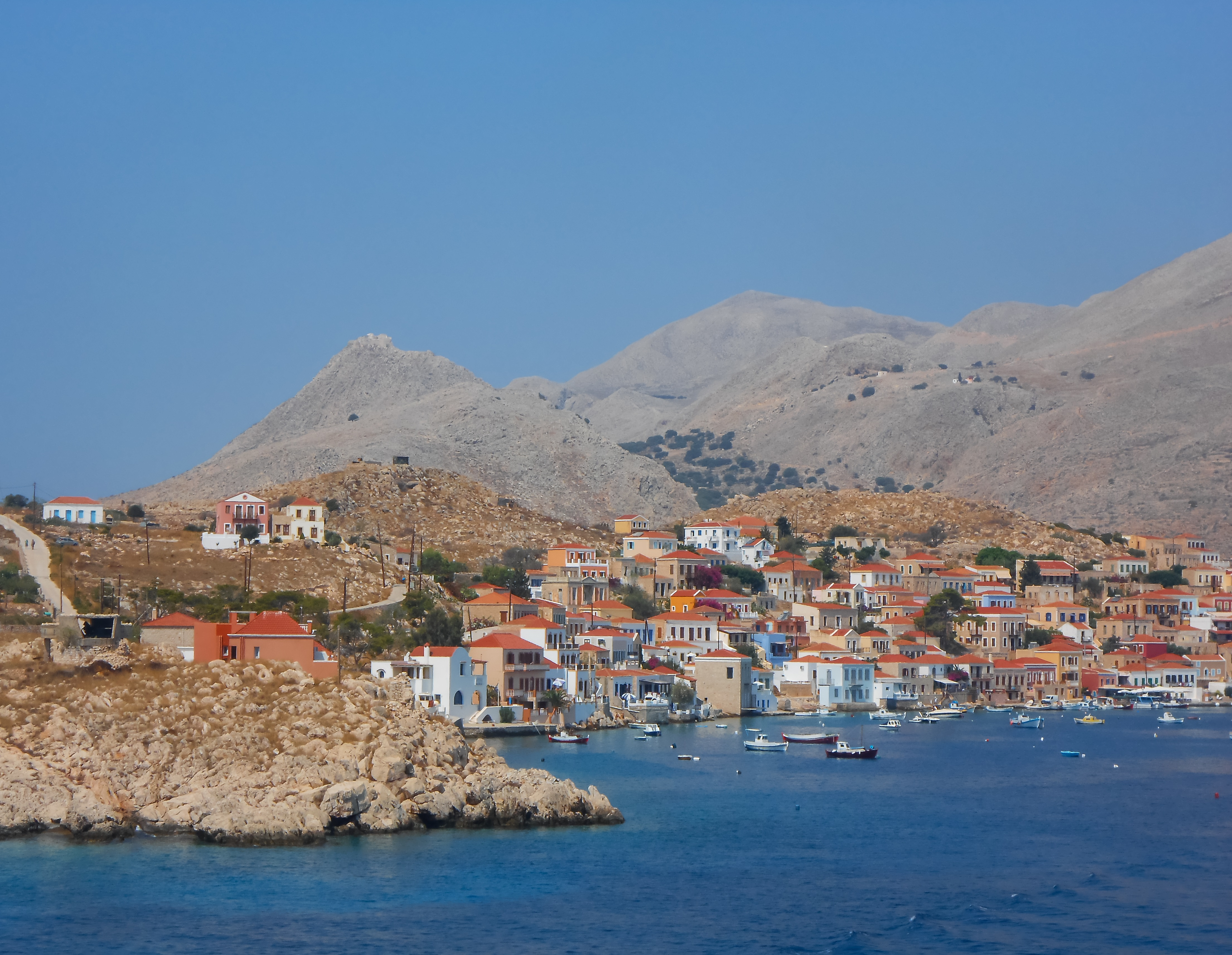
Port of Emporio, Halki Island, Dodecanese

Halki (Greek: Χάλκη [ˈxalki]; alternatively Chalce or Chalki) is a Greek island and municipality in the Dodecanese archipelago in the Aegean Sea, some 9 km (6 mi) west of Rhodes. It has an area of 28 km^{2} (11 sq mi). It is part of the Rhodes regional unit. It has a permanent population of 330 (increased during the summer months), concentrated in the only village of Emporio. The 2021 census showed a population of 475 inhabitants. The community is divided in two parts, Chorio (Χωριό, also spelled Horio, "Village") and Emporio (Εμποριό, "Market").

== History ==
The island supported a much larger population but, following emigration in the mid-20th century, Chorio was almost completely abandoned. A sizable group of the residents moved to Tarpon Springs, Florida, establishing the Greek-American community there that continues to this day. A ruined medieval castle of the Knights of St. John overlooks the old town and the chapel contains some of the original frescoes.

List of Halki rulers

Rhodian Hexapolis	700-408 BC
Rhodes	408-332 BC
Macedonian Empire	332-323 BC
Rhodes	323-164 BC
Roman Empire	164 BC - 395
Byzantine Empire	395 - 7th century
Arabs	7th century - 825
Byzantine Empire	825 - 1204
Venice	1204 -
Genoa	1523
Ottoman Empire	1523 - 1912
Italy	1912–1948
Greece	1948

== Municipality ==
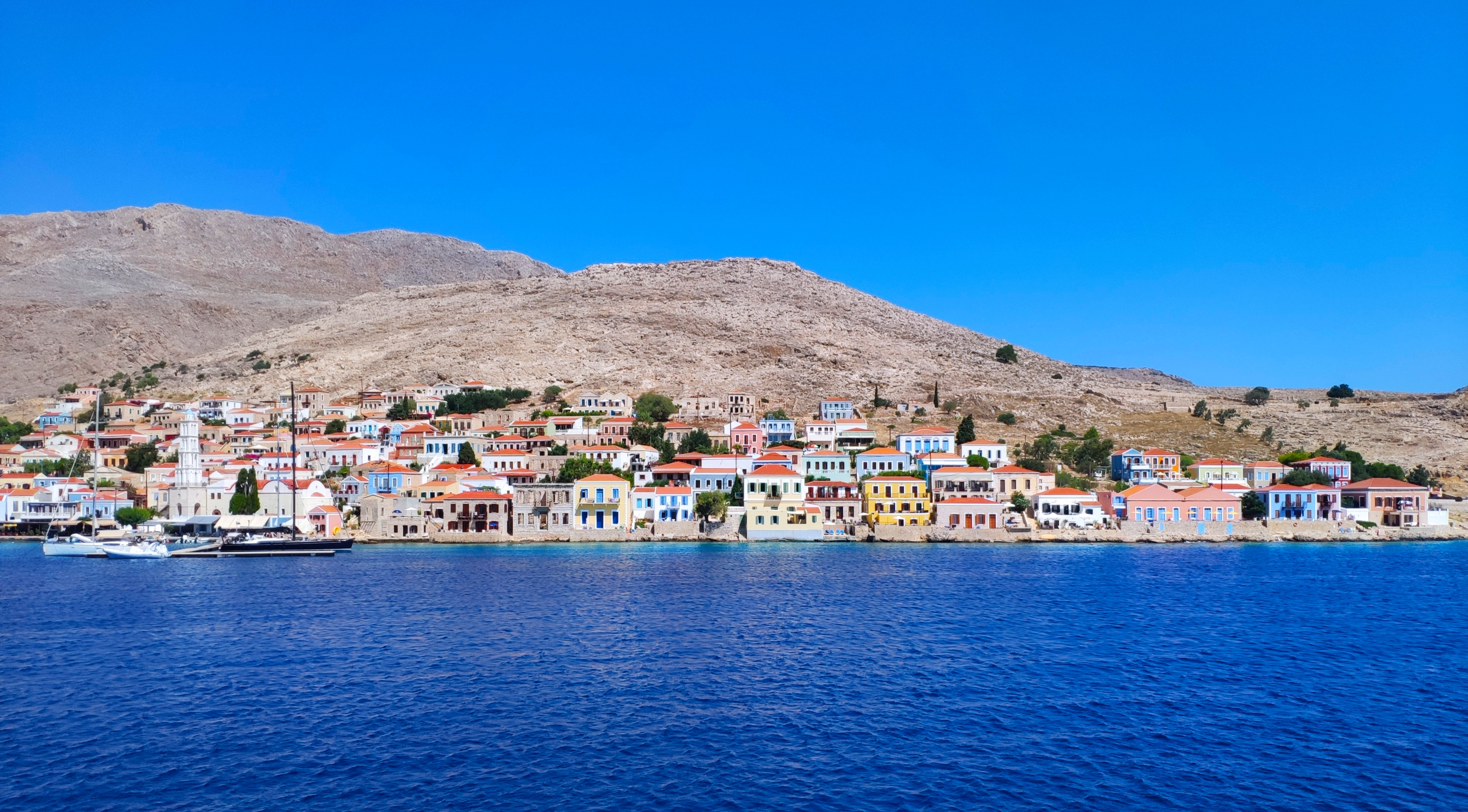
Church on the left and typical houses of Emporio

The Municipality of Chalki includes several uninhabited offshore islands, the largest of which is Alimia to the northeast, and has a total land area of 37.043 square kilometres (14.302 sq mi). The island's primary industry is tourism, although fishing is also substantial. There is virtually no natural water supply on the island and rainfall is collected in large cisterns. Drinking water is brought in from Rhodes, but there can be shortages during the summer months due to the increased population. As of 2014, there is a desalination plant on the island and the water boat no longer comes every few days. However, bottled water still arrives.

== Solar power ==
A solar park, currently generating 1.8 gigawatthours of electricity annually, is located on the island of Halki. This initiative is anticipated to diminish the island's carbon footprint, reducing CO_{2} emissions by an estimated 2,576 tonnes.

== People ==
- Alexandros Diakos (1911–1940), the first Greek casualty in WWII
- Dimitris Kremastinos (1942–2020), former Greek Minister of Health (1993–1996)

== See also ==
- List of Crusader castles
