= Rhodes International Airport =

Rhodes International Airport "Diagoras" Διεθνής Αερολιμένας Ρόδος "Διαγόρας"

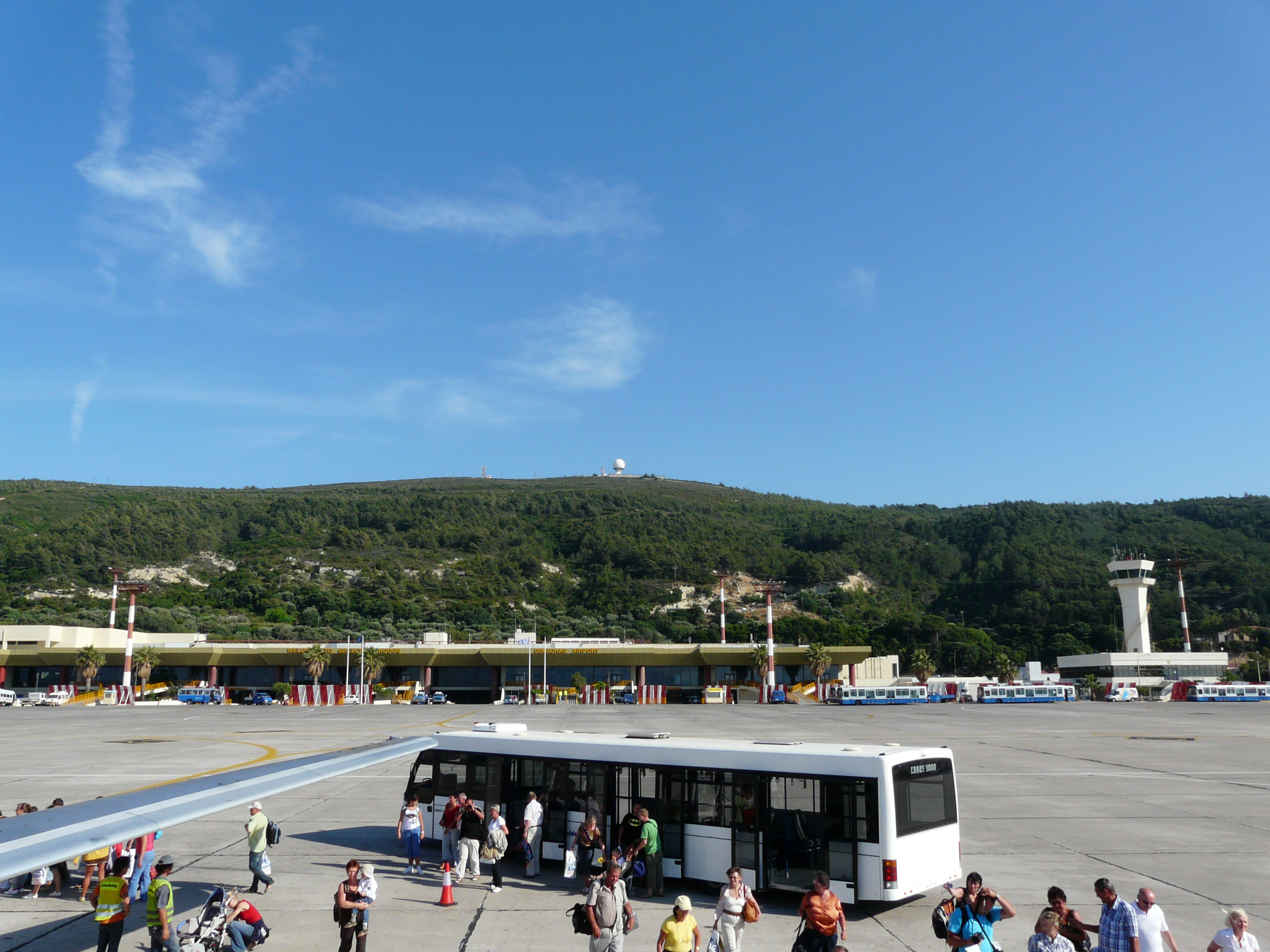
- IATA: RHO; ICAO: LGRP

Summary
- Airport type: Public
- Owner: Greek state
- Operator: Fraport Greece
- Serves: Rhodes
- Location: Paradeisi
- Hub for: Olympic Air
- Focus city for: Aegean Airlines
- Elevation AMSL: 6 m (20 ft)
- Coordinates: 36°24′19.51″N 28°05′10.29″E
- Website: rho-airport.gr

Map
- Location of airport in Greece

Runways
Direction	Length		Surface
Direction	m	ft	Surface
06/24	3,305	10,844	Asphalt

Statistics (2024)
- Passengers: 6,921,748
- Passenger traffic change: ▲12.7%
- Aircraft movements: 46,714
- Aircraft movements change: ▲8.4%
- Runway Statistics

Rhodes International Airport "Diagoras" (Greek: Διεθνής Αερολιμένας Ρόδου "Διαγόρας"), or Diagoras International Airport (IATA: RHO, ICAO: LGRP), is located on the West side of the island of Rhodes in Greece. The facility is located just north of the village Paradeisi, about 14 km (8.7 mi) southwest of the capital city, Rhodes. Rhodes International Airport was the fourth busiest airport in Greece as of 2019, with 5,542,567 passengers utilizing the airport.

== History ==
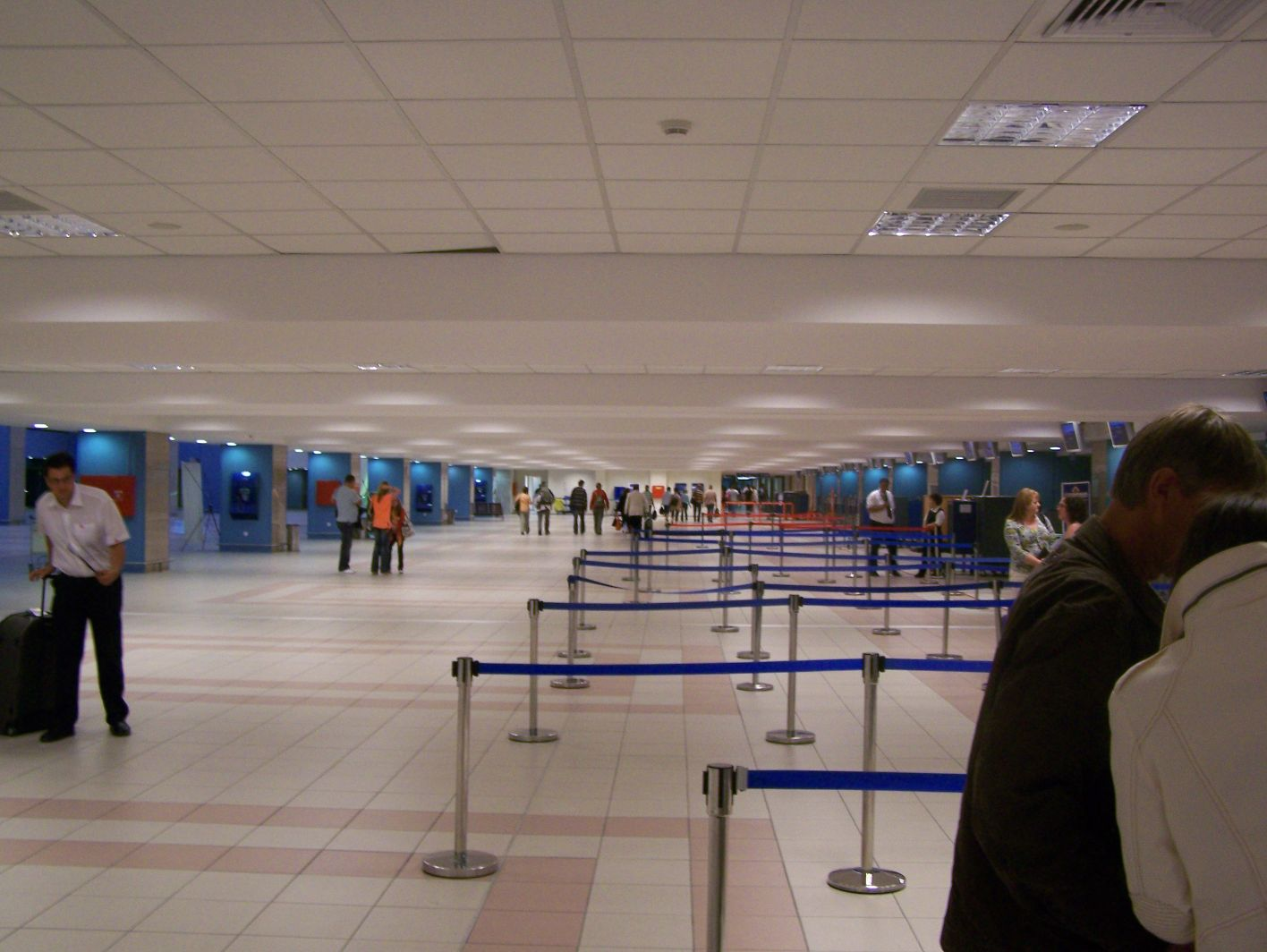
Check-in at Rhodes Airport

Civil aviation on Rhodes started after the Second World War, on the location of the nearby military Rhodes Maritsa Airport.

Improvements have been made to the airport, like expansion of taxiways, platform and airport buildings. The most recent upgrade is a new passenger terminal, opened in 2005, to accommodate the growing number of charter flights and passengers. The airport's plants currently cover a total area of 60,000 m^{2} (650,000 sq ft)

In December 2015, the privatisation of Rhodes International Airport and 13 other regional airports of Greece was finalised with the signing of the agreement between the Fraport AG/Copelouzos Group joint venture and the state privatisation fund. "We signed the deal today," the head of Greece's privatisation agency HRADF, Stergios Pitsiorlas, told Reuters. According to the agreement, the joint venture will operate the 14 airports (including Rhodes International Airport) for 40 years as of autumn 2016.

== Facilities ==
=== Runway ===
The airport's single runway direction is 065/245 degrees (designated as 06/24), having a length of 3,305 meters and a width of 60 meters. There are two taxiways and four taxi links connecting the runway with the apron. The apron with the new pushback configuration can accommodate up to 20 ICAO reference category C or smaller airplanes, simultaneously. Three parking positions have MARS (Multiple Apron Ramp System) capability and can accommodate larger category D and E aircraft, such as the Airbus A330, A340 and A350 and the Boeing 747, 757, 767, 777 and 787. There is a small general aviation apron with three dedicated positions for small propelled or jet aircraft.

== Future of the airport - Fraport Greece's investment plan ==
On 22 March 2017, the Fraport-Greece presented its master plan for the 14 regional airports including the International Airport of Rhodes.

The following summarizes the enhancement changes that started in November 2017 and will be implemented for Rhodes International Airport under Fraport Greece's investment plan: Immediate actions that were implemented at the airports as soon as Fraport Greece took over operations and before the launch of the 2017 Summer season included:

- General clean-up
- Improving lighting, marking of airside areas.
- Upgrading sanitary facilities
- Enhancing services and offering new free Internet connection (WiFi)
- Implementing works to improve fire safety in all the areas of the airports
- Remodeling the current terminal
- Reorganizing the airport apron area
- New fire station
- 13 percent increase in the number of check-in counters (from 40 to 45)
- 13 percent increase in the number of departure gates (from 16 to 18)
- 71 percent in the number of security-check lanes (from 7 to 12)
- 25 percent increase in the number of baggage reclaim belts (from 4 to 5)

== Airlines and destinations ==
The following airlines operate regular scheduled and charter flights at Rhodes Airport:

Airlines	Destinations
Aegean Airlines	Athens, Heraklion, Munich, Thessaloniki; Seasonal: Chania, Larnaca, Milos, Mykonos, Naxos, Oslo, Paphos, Santorini, Saarbrücken, Tel Aviv, Tirana; Seasonal charter: Friedrichshafen, Kristiansand, Paderborn/Lippstadt
Air France	Seasonal: Paris–Charles de Gaulle
Air Serbia	Seasonal: Belgrade
airBaltic	Seasonal: Riga, Tallinn
airHaifa	Seasonal: Haifa
Animawings	Seasonal: Bucharest–Otopeni, Timișoara
Arkia	Seasonal: Tel Aviv
Austrian Airlines	Seasonal: Vienna
BlueBird Airways	Seasonal: Tel Aviv
British Airways	Seasonal: London–Gatwick, London–Heathrow
Brussels Airlines	Seasonal: Brussels
Chair Airlines	Seasonal: Zurich
Condor	Seasonal: Berlin, Düsseldorf , Frankfurt, Hamburg, Munich, Münster/Osnabrück (begins 2 May 2027), Vienna, Zurich
Corendon Airlines	Seasonal: Cologne/Bonn, Düsseldorf, Hannover, Nuremberg, Tel Aviv
Corendon Dutch Airlines	Seasonal: Amsterdam, Brussels, Groningen
Cyprus Airways	Seasonal: Larnaca
Discover Airlines	Seasonal: Frankfurt, Munich
easyJet	Seasonal: Amsterdam, Basel/Mulhouse, Belfast–International, Berlin, Birmingham, Bristol, Edinburgh, Geneva, London–Gatwick, London–Luton, London–Southend (begins 27 April 2027), Manchester, Milan–Malpensa, Nantes, Naples, Newcastle upon Tyne, Paris–Orly
Edelweiss Air	Seasonal: Zurich
El Al	Seasonal: Tel Aviv
Electra Airways	Brno, Ostrava, Tel Aviv
Enter Air	Seasonal: Basel, Bydgoszcz, Gdańsk, Karlsruhe Baden-Baden, Katowice, Krakow, Łódź, Poznan, Warsaw, Wrocław
Eurowings	Seasonal: Berlin, Cologne/Bonn, Düsseldorf, Graz, Hamburg, Innsbruck, Nuremberg, Salzburg, Stuttgart
Finnair	Seasonal: Helsinki
Flyyo	Seasonal: Tel Aviv
Freebird Airlines	Seasonal: Cologne, Leipzig
GetJet Airlines	Seasonal: Belgrade, Vilnius
Gulf Air	Seasonal: Bahrain
Helvetic Airways	Seasonal: Bern
HiSky	Seasonal: Bucharest, Cluj, Oradea
Israir	Tel Aviv
ITA Airways	Seasonal: Milan–Linate, Rome–Fiumicino
Jet2.com	Seasonal: Belfast–International, Birmingham, Bournemouth, Bristol, East Midlands, Edinburgh, Glasgow, Leeds/Bradford, Liverpool, London–Gatwick, London–Luton, London–Stansted, Manchester, Newcastle upon Tyne
Jettime	Aalborg, Billund, Copenhagen, Stockholm–Arlanda
LEAV Aviation	Seasonal: Erfurt-Weimar Münster/Osnabrück
LOT Polish Airlines	Seasonal: Katowice, Warsaw–Chopin
Luxair	Seasonal: Luxembourg
Marabu	Seasonal: Hamburg, Leipzig, Nuremberg
Neos	Seasonal: Bologna, Catania, Heraklion, Milan Bergamo, Milan–Malpensa, Rome–Fiumicino, Tel Aviv, Verona
Norwegian Air Shuttle	Seasonal: Copenhagen, Oslo, Stavanger, Stockholm–Arlanda; Seasonal charter: Trondheim
Olympic Air	Karpathos, Kasos, Kastellorizo, Sitia
Pegasus Airlines	Seasonal: Istanbul–Sabiha Gökçen
Ryanair	Seasonal: Bari, Berlin, Birmingham, Bologna, Bournemouth, Brussels-Charleroi, Budapest, Catania, Cork, Dublin, East Midlands, Edinburgh, Kaunas, Kraków, London–Stansted, Manchester, Milan Bergamo, Naples, Paphos, Pisa, Prague, Rome–Ciampino, Rome–Fiumicino, Sofia, Stockholm–Arlanda, Vienna, Warsaw–Modlin, Weeze
Scandinavian Airlines	Seasonal: Copenhagen, Oslo; Seasonal charter: Gothenburg, Luleå, Stockholm–Arlanda, Trondheim
Sky Express	Athens, Chios, Heraklion, Kalymnos, Karpathos, Kos, Lemnos, Leros, Mytilene, Samos; Seasonal: Thessaloniki; Seasonal charter: Belgrade Cluj-Napoca, Iași, Sibiu, Timișoara
Smartwings	Seasonal: Bratislava, Brno, Košice, Ostrava, Prague Warsaw; Seasonal charter: České Budějovice, Poznań, Rzeszow
Sunclass Airlines	Seasonal charter: Billund, Copenhagen, Göteborg, Malmö, Oslo, Stavanger
Sundair	Seasonal: Bremen, Dresden
Sundor	Seasonal: Tel Aviv
Swiss International Air Lines	Seasonal: Geneva
Transavia	Seasonal: Amsterdam, Eindhoven, Lyon, Nantes, Paris–Orly
TUI Airways	Seasonal: Birmingham, Bournemouth, Cardiff, East Midlands, Exeter, Glasgow, London–Gatwick, London–Stansted, Manchester, Newcastle upon Tyne, Norwich
TUI fly Belgium	Seasonal: Brussels, Ostend/Bruges
TUI fly Deutschland	Seasonal: Düsseldorf, Frankfurt, Hannover, Munich, Stuttgart
TUI fly Netherlands	Seasonal: Amsterdam, Dublin, Eindhoven, Rotterdam/The Hague
TUS	Tel Aviv
Volotea	Seasonal: Lille, Lyon, Nantes, Naples
Widerøe	Sanderfjord
Wizz Air	Seasonal: Budapest, Chișinău, London–Luton, Rome–Fiumicino, Sofia, Yerevan, Warsaw–Chopin

== Statistics ==
Figures are taken from the Hellenic Civil Aviation Authority (CAA) until 2016 and since 2017 from the official website of the airport.

Year	Passengers		
Year	Domestic	International	Total
1994	380,072	2,111,714	2,491,786
1995	▲419,701	▼1,924,922	▼2,344,623
1996	▲477,396	▼1,764,121	▼2,241,517
1997	▲559,768	▲1,955,527	▲2,515,295
1998	▼535,284	▲2,137,028	▲2,672,312
1999	▲638,389	▲2,653,129	▲3,291,518
2000	▲720,560	▲2,686,490	▲3,407,050
2001	▼682,469	▲2,745,706	▲3,428,175
2002	▼628,837	▼2,601,646	▼3,230,483
2003	▲689,315	▼2,476,755	▼3,166,070
2004	▲697,873	▼2,338,650	▼3,036,523
2005	▲750,476	▲2,457,038	▲3,207,514
2006	▲809,965	▲2,681,557	▲3,491,522
2007	▲839,326	▲2,786,636	▲3,625,962
2008	▲843,529	▼2,723,940	▼3,567,469
2009	▼826,677	▼2,643,434	▼3,470,111
2010	▼736,566	▲2,850,006	▲3,586,572
2011	▼676,463	▲3,471,923	▲4,148,386
2012	▼600,167	▼3,213,780	▼3,813,947
2013	▲626,594	▲3,573,465	▲4,200,059
2014	▲691,040	▲3,861,016	▲4,552,056
2015	▲793,025	▼3,785,998	▲4,579,023
2016	▲848,878	▲4,093,508	▲4,942,386
2017	▲868,459	▲4,432,764	▲5,301,223
2018	▼829,475	▲4,738,273	▲5,567,748
2019	▼803,996	▲4,738,571	▼5,542,567
2020	▼352,985	▼1,198,138	▼1,551,123
2021	▲516,927	▲2,849,687	▲3,366,614
2022	▲708,866	▲5,148,170	▲5,857,036
2023	▲850,925	▲5,291,888	▲6,142,813
2024	▲906,241	▲6,015,507	▲6,921,748
2025	▲953,718	▲6.139,546	▲7.093,264

=== Traffic statistics by country (2025) ===
Traffic by country at Rhodes International Airport (2025)
Place	Country	Total passengers
1	United Kingdom	1,654,507
2	Germany	1,156,337
3	Greece	953,718
4	Poland	430,992
5	Israel	300,595
6	Sweden	276,503
7	Italy	232,788
8	France	217,774
9	Czech Republic	217,161
10	Denmark	213,830
11	Netherlands	205,624
12	Austria	194,198
13	Finland	185,982
14	Belgium	175,263
15	Norway	167,684

== Ground transportation ==
By public bus: There is a bus stop located between the old and new terminals with regular services between the airport and Rhodes Town, including stops at Kremasti and Ialysos. Buses terminate just north of the Medieval City of Rhodes at the West Coast Terminal (Routes 50, 53, and 61), with a travel time of 30 to 40 minutes.

By taxi: Rhodes Town is located approximately 14 km north - east from Rhodes Airport, (A 24 - minute drive), with an official taxi stand available at the airport opposite the Terminal 1 Arrivals hall.

Hotel transfers / shuttles: Some Rhodes Town hotels offer shuttle services, and tour operators such as TUI UK and Jet2holidays provide transfers to and from the airport to customer's accommodation as part of their package holidays.

Car rental: Car rental desks operate at the airport with operators such as Avis Budget, Enterprise, Hertz, and Sixt.

== See also ==
- List of the busiest airports in Greece
- Transport in Greece
