= Petaloudes =

Municipal unit in Rhodes, Greece, associated with "the valley of the butterflies."

Petaloudes Πεταλούδες
- Municipal unit
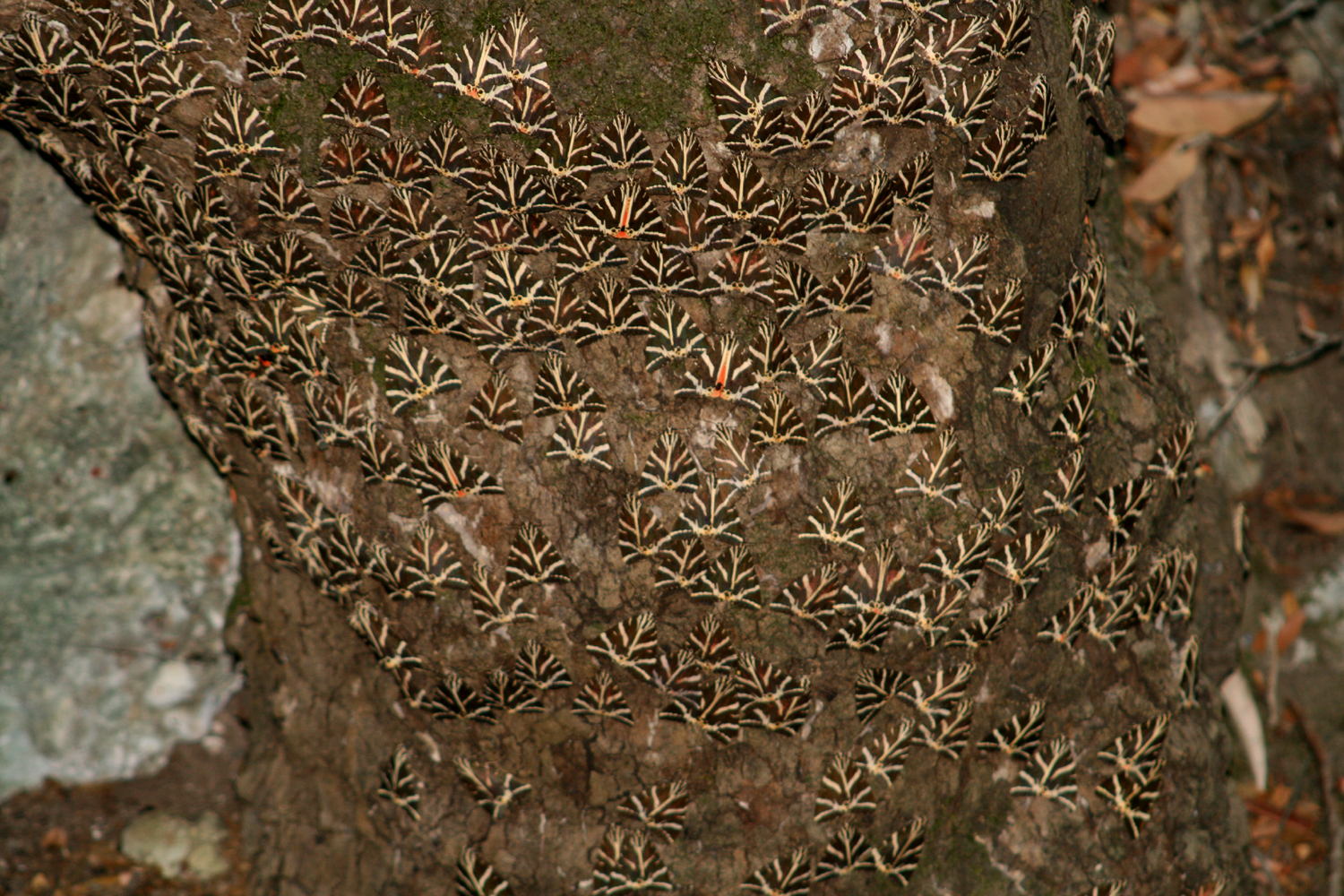
- Euplagia quadripunctaria rhodosensis resting on an Oriental sweetgum (Liquidambar orientalis) tree trunk in the valley

- Location within Rhodes

- Location within Greece
- Coordinates: 36°25′N 28°07′E
- Country: Greece
- Administrative region: South Aegean
- Regional unit: Rhodes
- Municipality: Rhodes

Area
  - Municipal unit: 89.2 km^{2} (34.4 sq mi)

Population (2021)
  - Municipal unit: 15,086
  - Municipal unit density: 169/km^{2} (438/sq mi)
- Time zone: UTC+2 (EET)
  - Summer (DST): UTC+3 (EEST)

Petaloudes (Greek: Πεταλούδες) is a former municipality on the island of Rhodes, in the Dodecanese, Greece. Since the 2011 local government reform it is part of the municipality Rhodes, of which it is a municipal unit. Its population was 15,086 in 2021. It includes the villages of Kremasti, Paradisi, Theologos (Tholos), Damatria, Maritsa, and Pastida. The seat of the municipality was in Kremasti. The land area is 89.150 km^{2}.

The Petaloudes Valley (sometimes known as Valley of the Butterflies) is home to thousands of the Rhodes subspecies of the Jersey tiger moth (Euplagia quadripunctaria rhodosensis) that cover the entire landscape after the wet season (late May) due to the high humidity in the area. The Oriental sweetgum trees in Petaloudes Valley give off a scent that attracts the moths and creates a unique biotope. Owing to the increased number of visitors, the Euplagia are facing population issues as they have no stomach and when disturbed tend to fly frequently and thus deplete their energy.

== Gallery ==
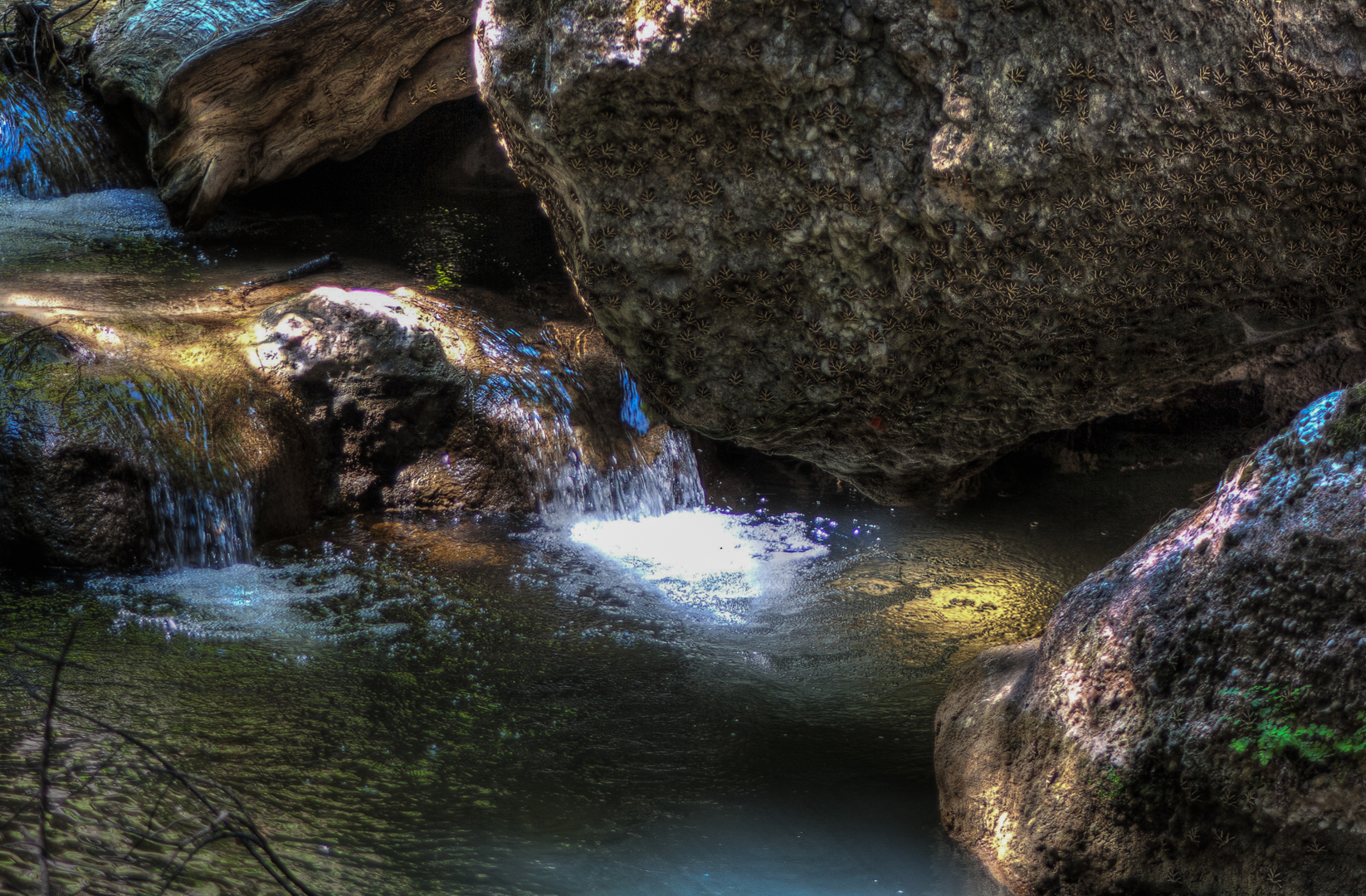
Waterfall at Petaloudes valley

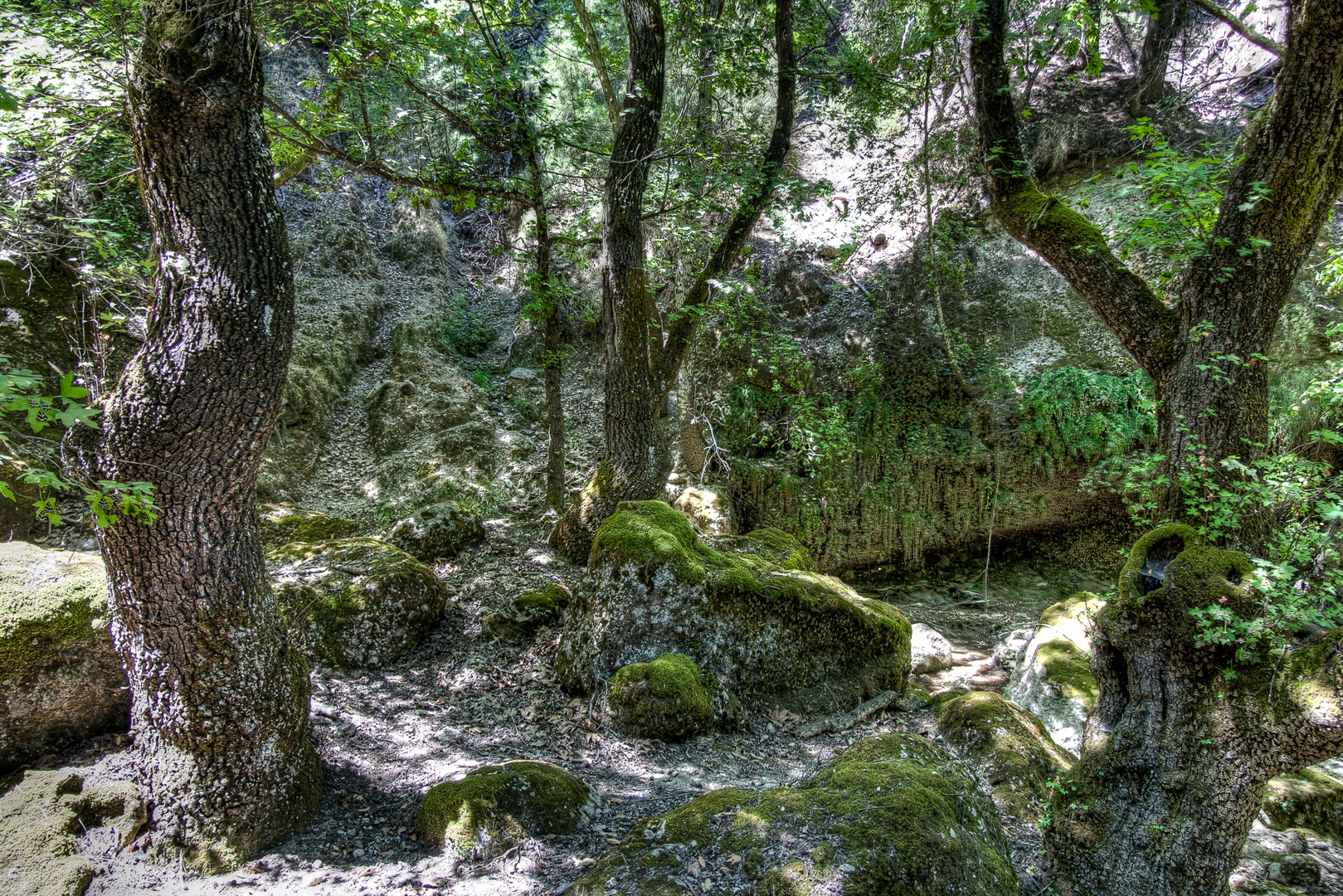
Forest at Petaloudes valley

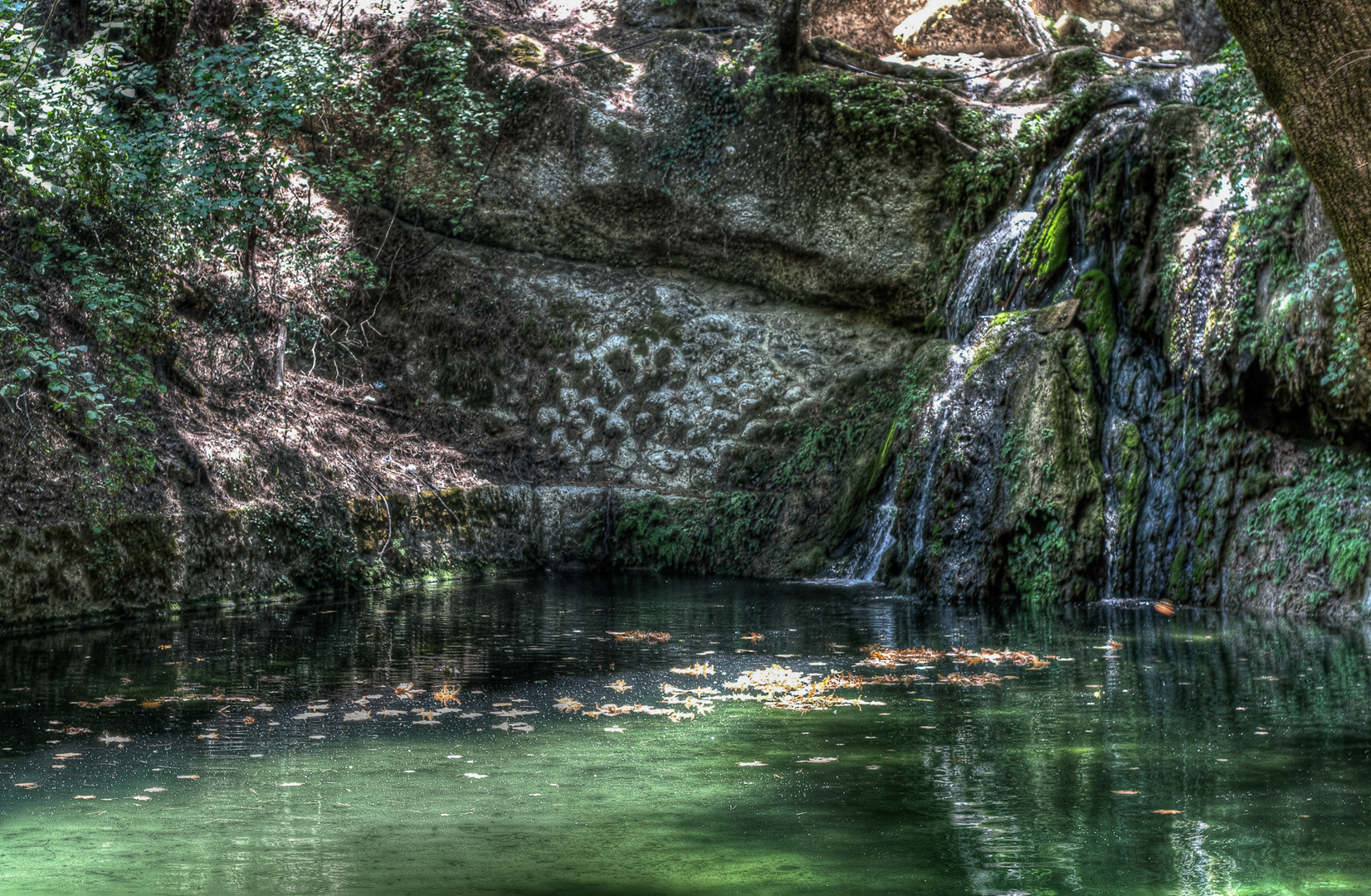
Landscape at Petaloudes valley

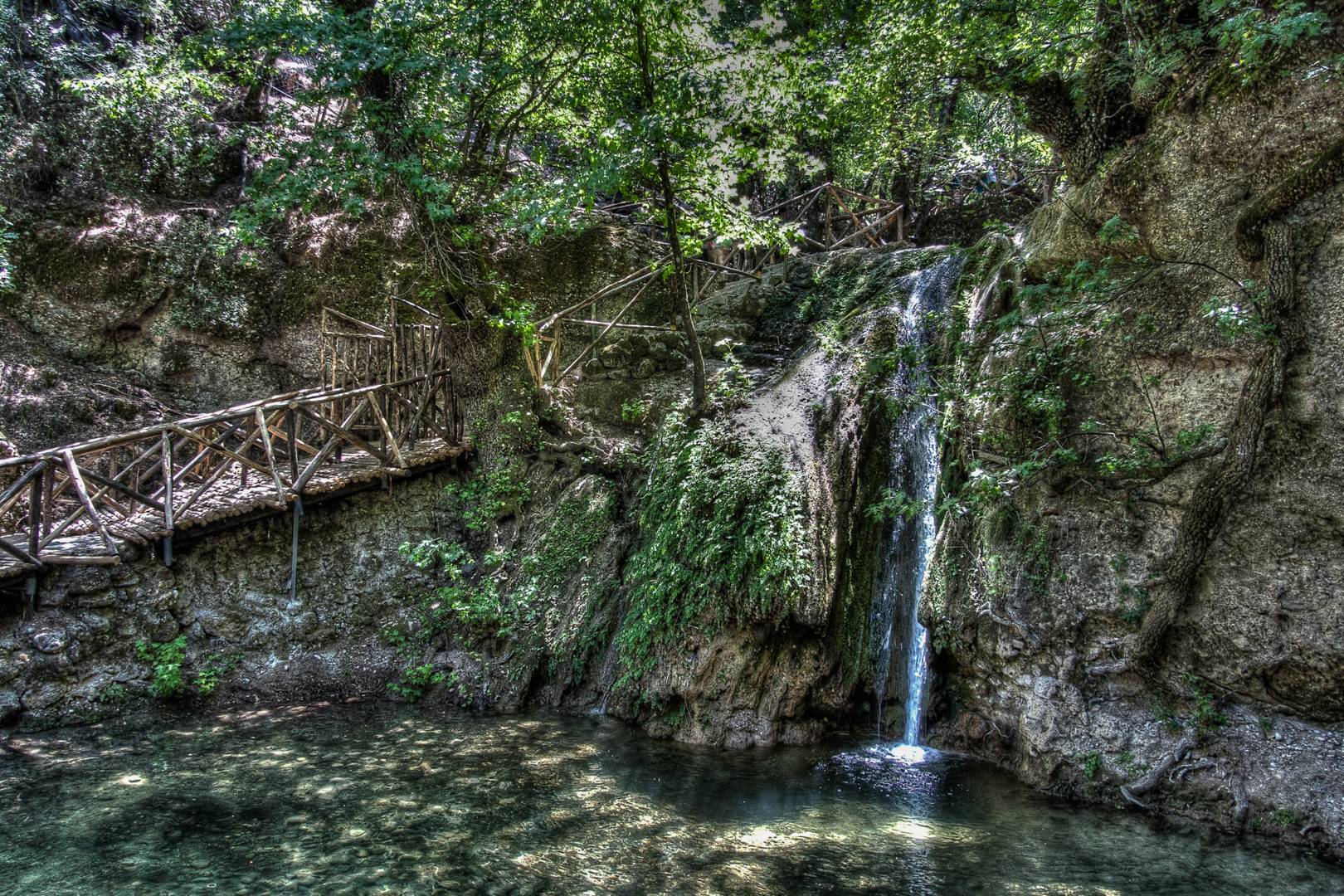
Landscape at Petaloudes valley

== In popular culture ==
The valley and its unique ecology play a key role in Race of Scorpions, Book Three in Dorothy Dunnett's House of Niccolo series of historical novels.
