= Marmaronisi =

Greek islet in the Aegean Sea

Native name: Μαρμαρονήσι
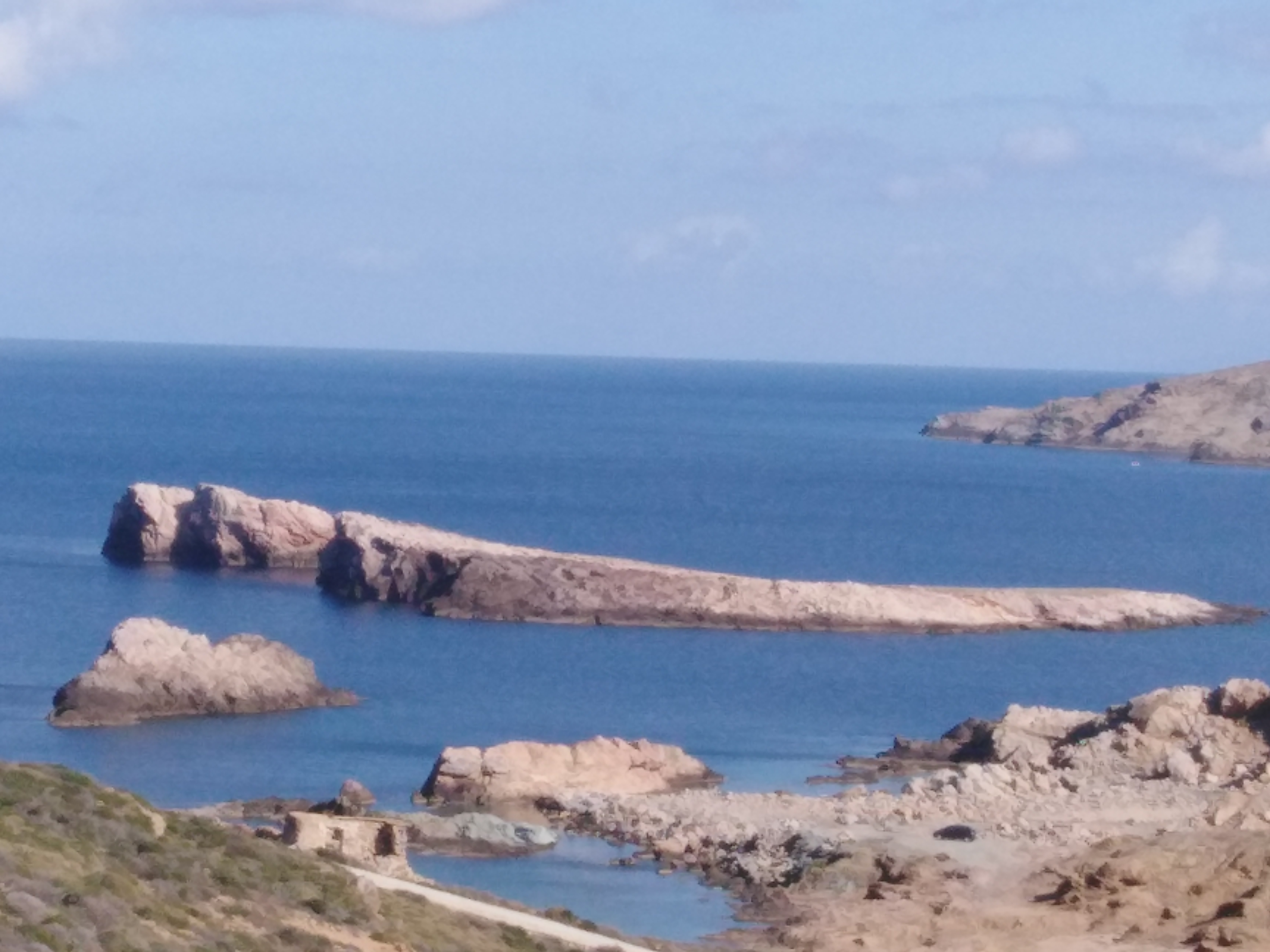
- View of Marmaronisi

- Location within Greece

Geography
- Coordinates: 37°29′32″N 25°22′00″E
- Archipelago: Cyclades

Administration
- Greece
- Region: South Aegean
- Regional unit: Mykonos

Demographics
- Population: 0 (2001)

Additional information
- Postal code: 846 00
- Area code: 22890
- Vehicle registration: EM

Marmaronisi (Greek: Μαρμαρονήσι) is a small uninhabited rock island on the northern side of Mykonos in the Cyclades. It is located at the entrance of the bay of Panormos and opposite the settlement of Agios Sostis.

Marmaronisi is named for the composition of the rocks of the island, which is also suitable for manufacturing lime.
