= Paradisi =

Paradisi may refer to:

== People ==
- Domenico Paradisi, Italian painter, active in Rome in the late 17th century
- Giulio Paradisi, an Italian film director, actor and screenwriter
- Pietro Domenico Paradisi, an Italian composer

== Peculiars ==
- Indian paradise flycatcher (Terpsiphone paradisi) A bird that inhabits the southern Asian Continent.

== Places ==
- Paradisi, Greece, a village on the Greek island of Rhodes
- Paradisi (Laconia), Greece, a village in the Greek municipality of Vatika
