= Theologos, Rhodes =

Theologos Θεολόγος
- Community
- Location within Greece
- Coordinates: 36°22′29″N 28°02′11″E
- Country: Greece
- Administrative region: South Aegean
- Regional unit: Rhodes
- Municipality: Rhodes
- Municipal unit: Petaloudes

Population (2021)
  - Community: 809
- Time zone: UTC+2 (EET)
  - Summer (DST): UTC+3 (EEST)

Theologos (also known as Tholos) is a village on the Greek island of Rhodes. It is located on the west coast of the island, about 19 km far from the capital. It is a part of the municipal unit of Petaloudes. The old centre of Tholos is built in traditional Rhodian style with tall shuttered buildings and narrow streets. The church of Agios Spiridonas, with its white bell tower, is among the attractions. It has an attraction for holiday makers with many people coming from all over Europe. Not far from the airport, the town's accessibility makes it even for tourists and in 2004 celebrated tourists who had visited more than once with an award naming them as 'dedicated friends'.
