= Tholos =

Τholos may refer to:

- Tholos (architecture), a circular structure, often a temple, of ancient Greece and ancient Rome, and in classical or neoclassical architecture
  - Tholos of Delphi, a circular building located approximately 800 metres from the main site of the ruined Temple of Apollo at Delphi
  - Tholos (Epidaurus), a circular building with an ornate astronomical floor design
  - Tholos (Washington DC), the highest part of the United States Capitol dome, on which the Statue of Freedom stands
- Tholos tomb, or beehive tomb
- Tholos, keyhole-shaped houses of the Halaf culture of the Ancient Near East
- Tholos, an alternative name of Theologos, Rhodes, a village in Greece
- Tholos, an institution in Athens where merchants were required to take their weights for comparison with the approved standards.
