= Kallithea, Rhodes =

Kallithea Καλλιθέα
- Municipal unit
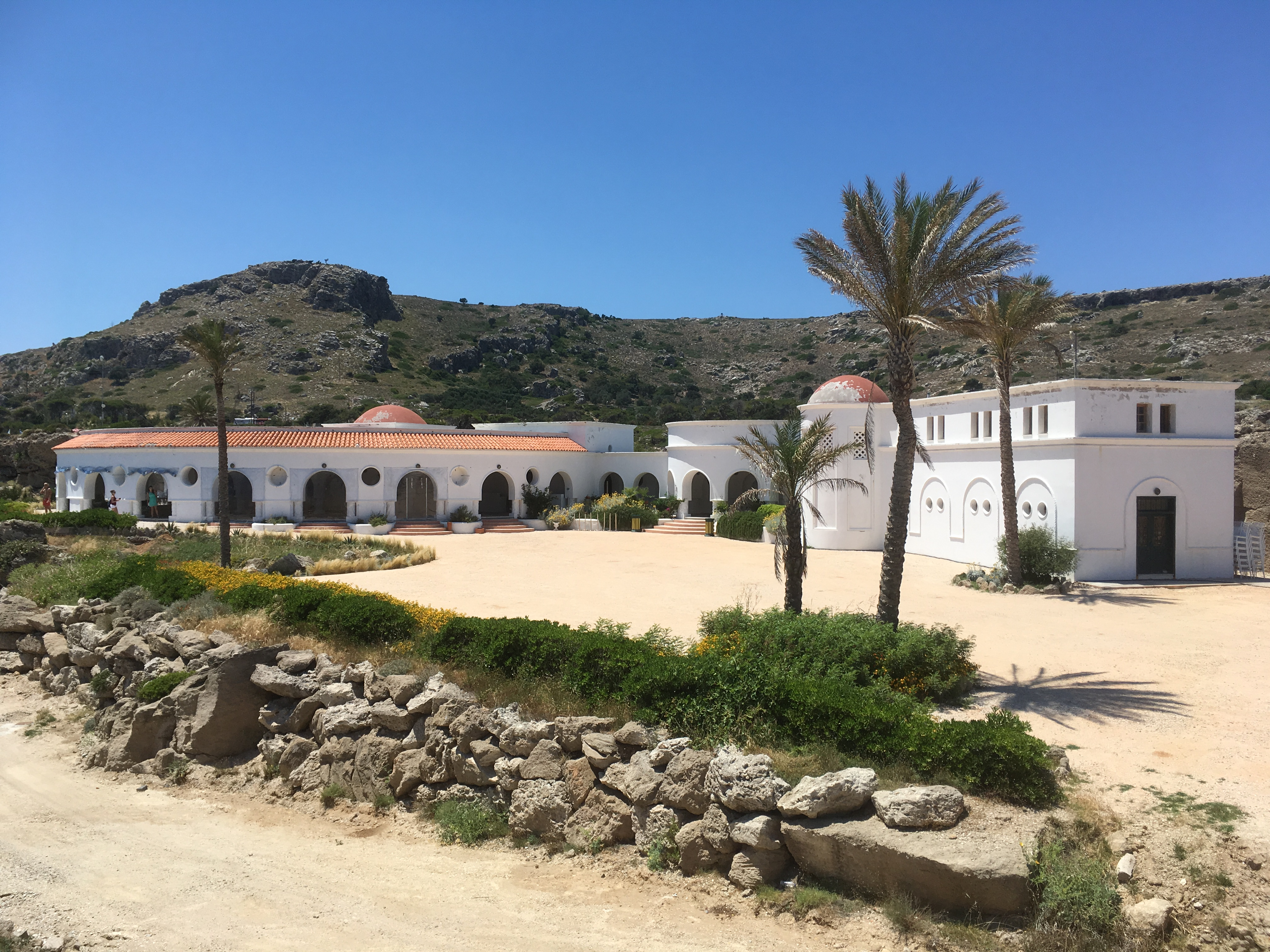
- Architecture in Kalithea

- Location within Rhodes

- Location within Greece
- Coordinates: 36°20′N 28°10′E
- Country: Greece
- Administrative region: South Aegean
- Regional unit: Rhodes
- Municipality: Rhodes

Area
  - Municipal unit: 109.8 km^{2} (42.4 sq mi)

Population (2021)
  - Municipal unit: 10,416
  - Municipal unit density: 94.86/km^{2} (245.7/sq mi)
- Time zone: UTC+2 (EET)
  - Summer (DST): UTC+3 (EEST)

Kallithea (Greek: Καλλιθέα) is a former municipality on the island of Rhodes, in the Dodecanese, Greece. Since the 2011 local government reform it is part of the municipality Rhodes, of which it is a municipal unit. It lies on the northeastern portion of the island, just south of the City of Rhodes. The population is 10,416 (2021 census) and the land area is 109.75 km^{2}. The seat of the municipality was in Kalythies. The beach resort Faliraki is also situated in the municipal unit.
