= Music School of Rhodes (Greece) =

Coordinates: 36.386615°N 28.200042°E

Μουσικό Σχολείο Ρόδου

Location
- Eparxiaki Odos Koskinou; Rhodes, 85100

Information
- Type: Music School
- Established: September 1993
- Headteacher: Theologos Christos
- Staff: 68
- Gender: Mixed
- Age: 11 to 18
- Enrolment: 230 approx
- School Years: Years 1–6
- Website: http://gym-mous-rodou.dod.sch.gr/

The Music School of Rhodes (Μουσικό Σχολείο Ρόδου) is a school located on Rhodes Island in the Koskinou region of Greece, which specialises in teaching music. The current head teacher of the school is Christos Theologos. It opened in September 1993 with only 28 pupils and 10 teachers. At the end of summer 2013, the school was recorded to have a roll of 231 pupils and 68 teachers. Νοw the school have 335 pupils and 78 teachers. The school is made up of 15 sections of which 9 are for pupils in the first 3 years of high school and 6 for the use of pupils in the last 3 years of high school. Although the school mainly specialises in music, other subjects are also taught to pupils such as maths, physics, literature and languages. The school is open from Monday to Friday between the hours of 08:00 to 15:00.

== Events ==
The music school regularly hosts events and festivals for the public to attend. The events that are held vary from operas to concerts. Other events are culturally themed such as the "Dancing and Singing in Asia minor" event. Another event which featured at the Music School of Rhodes Island was the "Music Stand" event which took viewers into Alexandros Papadiamantis' word of romantic short stories. The Music School of Rhodes also hold a music festival every year in which its students get to take part in the event.

=== Music festival ===
The music school, along with the Department of the Dodecanese of the South Aegean Region and the Municipal Culture Sports Organisation of the Municipality of Rhodes (DOPAR), is set to be hosting a festival showcasing the Creation of Contemporary Music. The main purpose of the event is to allow young musicians to express themselves and show their talents by providing them with the best possible opportunity for expression. All that is required to allow students to perform at the festival is that they have passed the music audition before the festival begins. This festival is the 3rd of its kind following the success of the 2nd festival which was organised by the Region of Southern Aegean, Department of Culture, and took place in 2011.

The 2nd Festival of Contemporary Music Creation lasted 2 days and consisted of 25 bands, consisting of the Dodecanese, performing over the 2 days. The 1st festival, lasting only 1 day, brought 1000 spectators and the 2nd festival brought more than 1500 spectators over the 2 days it ran for. The reason as to why the music school itself was chosen to hold all 3 of the festivals is due to the fact that its location combines historical monuments and natural beauty providing the perfect backdrop to the festivals.

The 3rd festival of the Creation of Contemporary Music is divided into 3 phases. The 1st phase involves the students, who wish for their bands to participate, submitting applications for performing in the festival. The 2nd phase is where the bands are invited to the hearing in the Music School's auditorium where they perform in front of The Arts Committee of the festival. The committee then evaluate each band determining whether or not they reach the artistic criteria required to move on to the 3rd phase. The 3rd phase involves all of the groups who the Arts Committee determined suitable being given their performance slots. The Arts Committee use the 3 phases to achieve their goal in ensuring the hard working bands are able to go on to perform at the festival and showcase their talents.

For the last three years, the Music School organizes the music festival "Rhodes: Crossroads of Cultures and Partnerships of Music Schools", with the participation of many different musical ensembles from various music schools.

== Other projects ==
Screenshot of Rollit! gameplay

- The school's computer department produced a 3D game in 2012 called Rollit! which is available online to play. Students Kalogerakis Alexander, Kapsimalis Panagiotis and Ntitsef Theodore from class C worked together to create the 3D game using Unity3d javascript. The game requires the players to make their way through a maze, collecting flags and then reaching the levels exit before time runs out.
- The game "Τhe journey of the mouse": This game was made in collaboration with the students of the Second Grade Gymnasium of the Music School of Rhodes, with the aim of a fun and creative learning process of the Geography of Europe
- School Radio
- Sports
- Concerts
- Otherprojects: 2023
