= Kremasti =

Kremasti Κρεμαστή
- Community
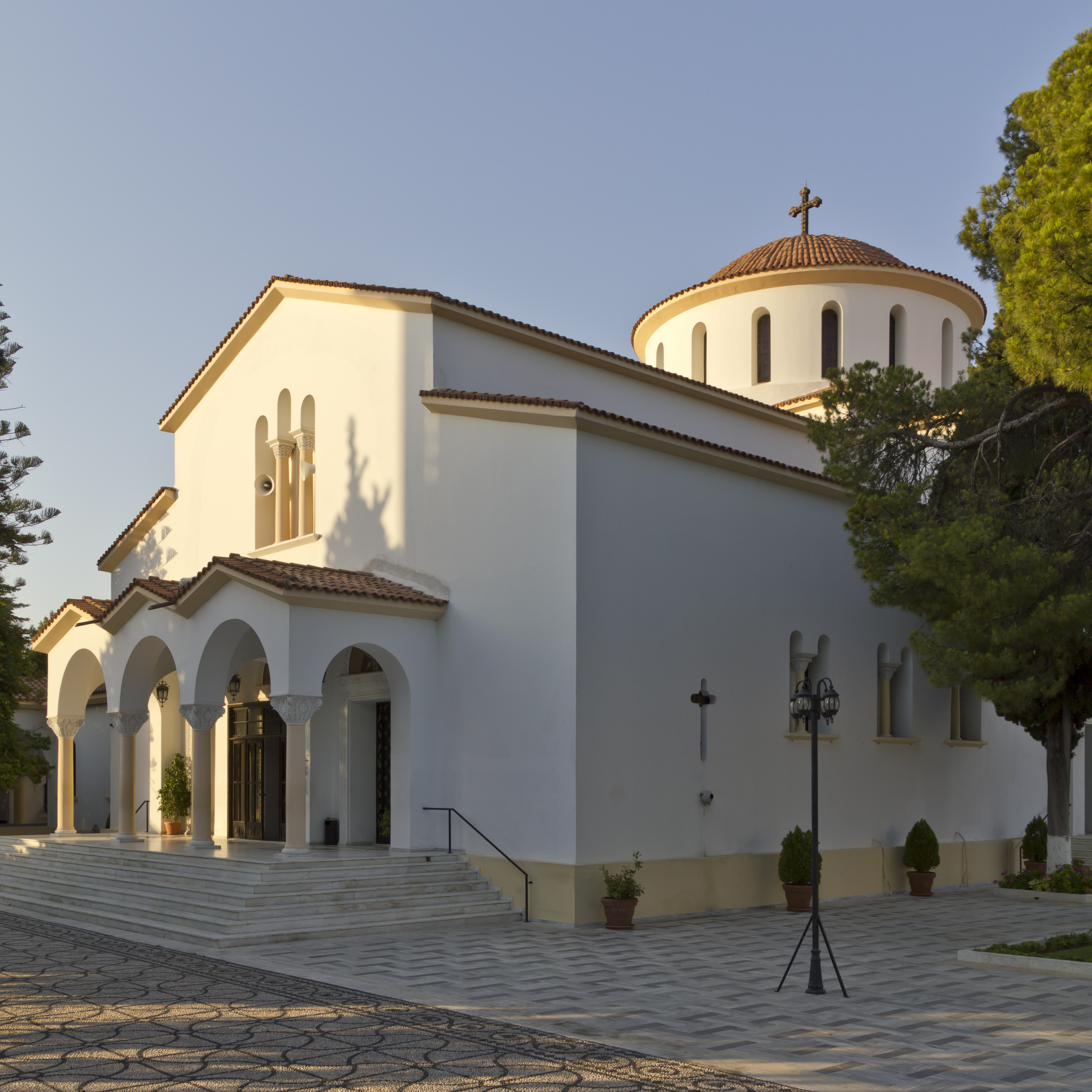
- Church in Kremasti

- Location within Greece
- Coordinates: 36°24′43″N 28°07′15″E
- Country: Greece
- Administrative region: South Aegean
- Regional unit: Rhodes
- Municipality: Rhodes
- Municipal unit: Petaloudes

Population (2021)
  - Community: 5,597
- Time zone: UTC+2 (EET)
  - Summer (DST): UTC+3 (EEST)

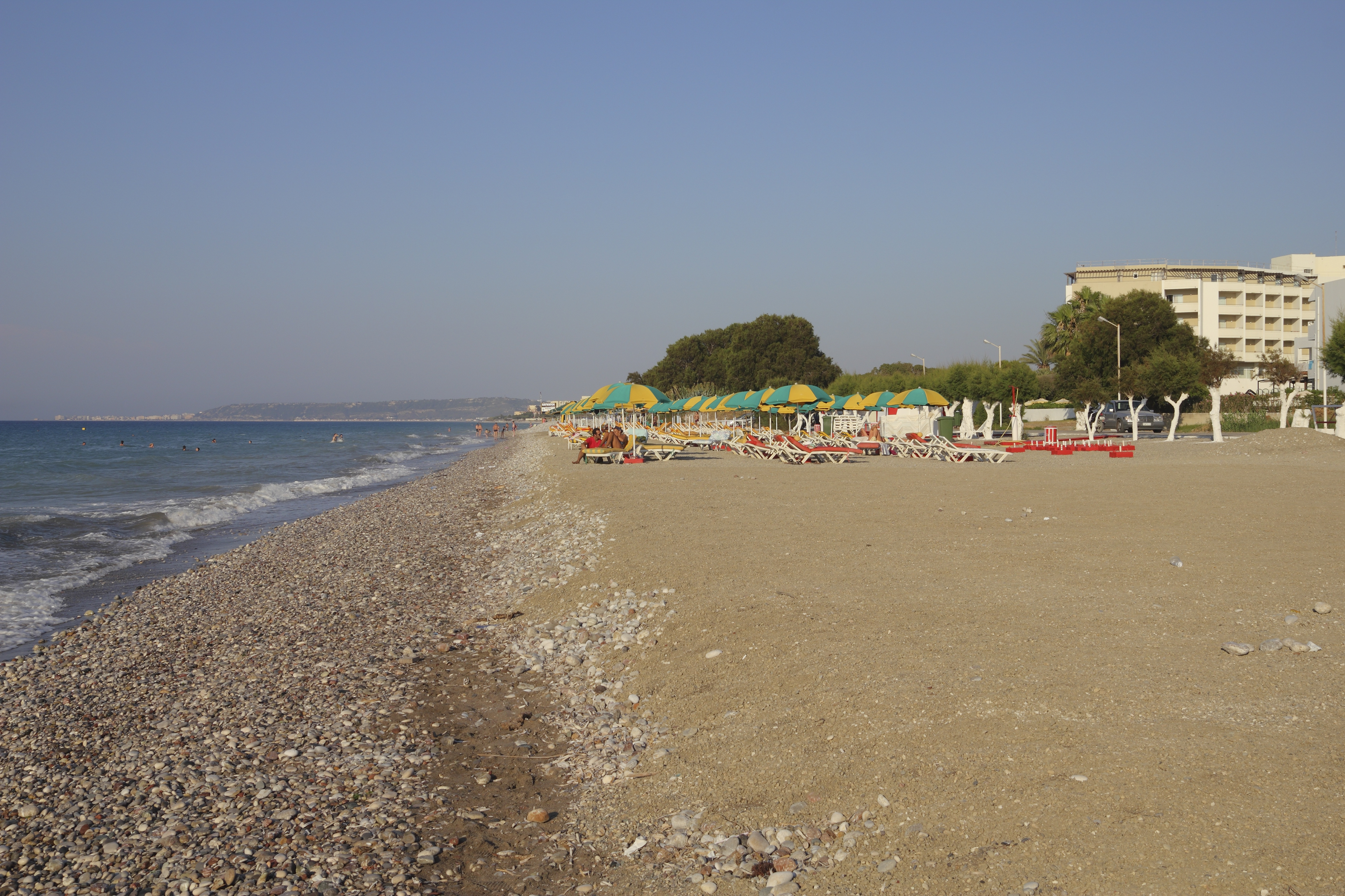
The beach of Kremasti

Kremasti (Greek: Κρεμαστή) is a town on the Greek island of Rhodes (Ρόδος, Ródhos). Located on the west coast of the island, Kremasti is 12 kilometers from the capital of Rhodes, on the road to the airport. It has a population of 5,597 people (2021 census) and was the administrative center of the former municipality of Petaloudes.

On a hill near the center of town are the ruins of a medieval castle. The local church, Panagia Katholiki (Virgin Mary) is one of the largest on the island. The interior is decorated with murals and wood carvings.

Next to the church is the municipal library, which has classic Greek columns. Kremasti has a beach on the Aegean Sea. It is not far from Petaloudes (Butterfly Valley) one of the island's major tourist attractions in the summer.
