= Faliraki =

Beach resort in Rhodes, Greece

Coordinates: 36°20′N 28°12′E

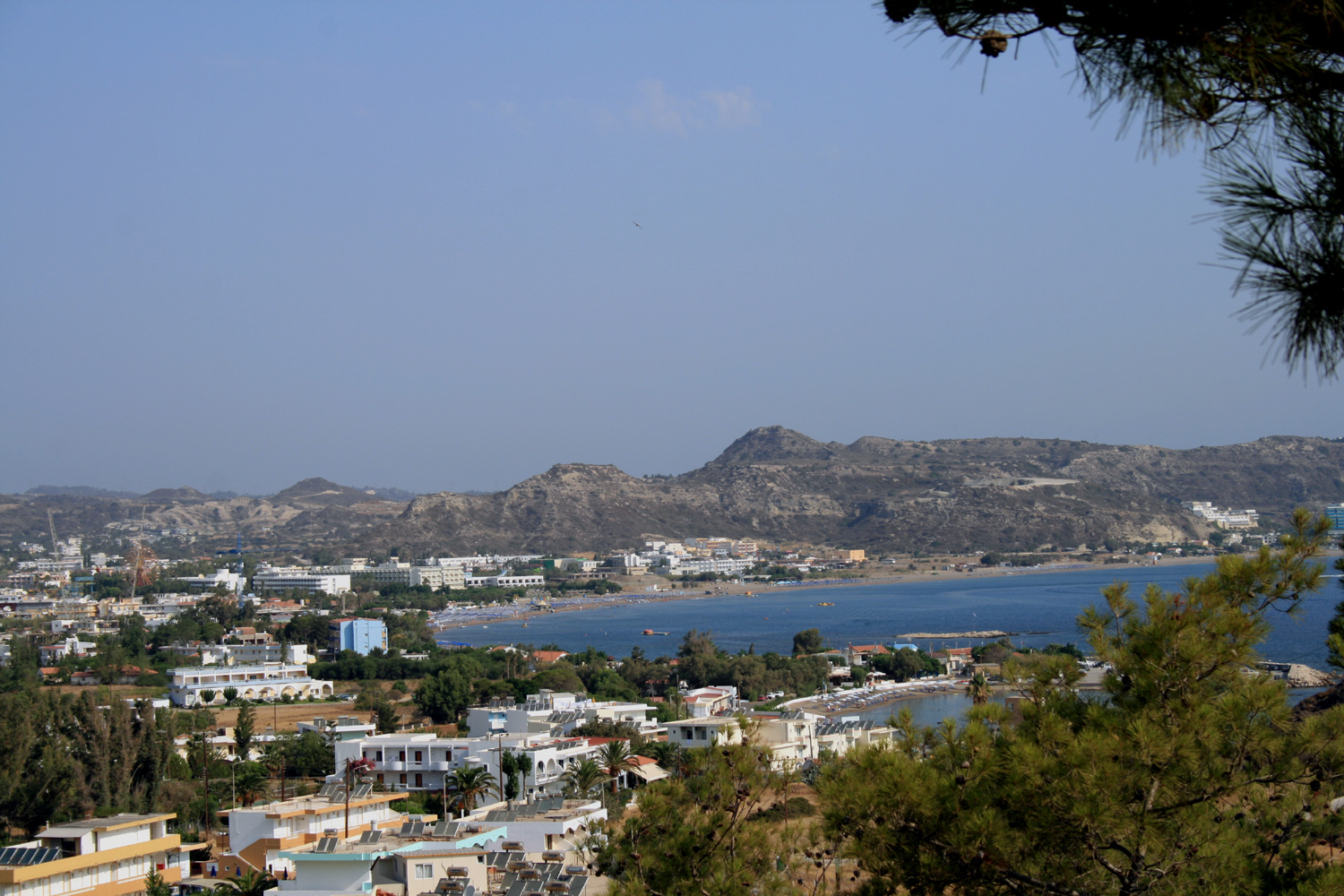
Overview of Faliraki beach and hotels

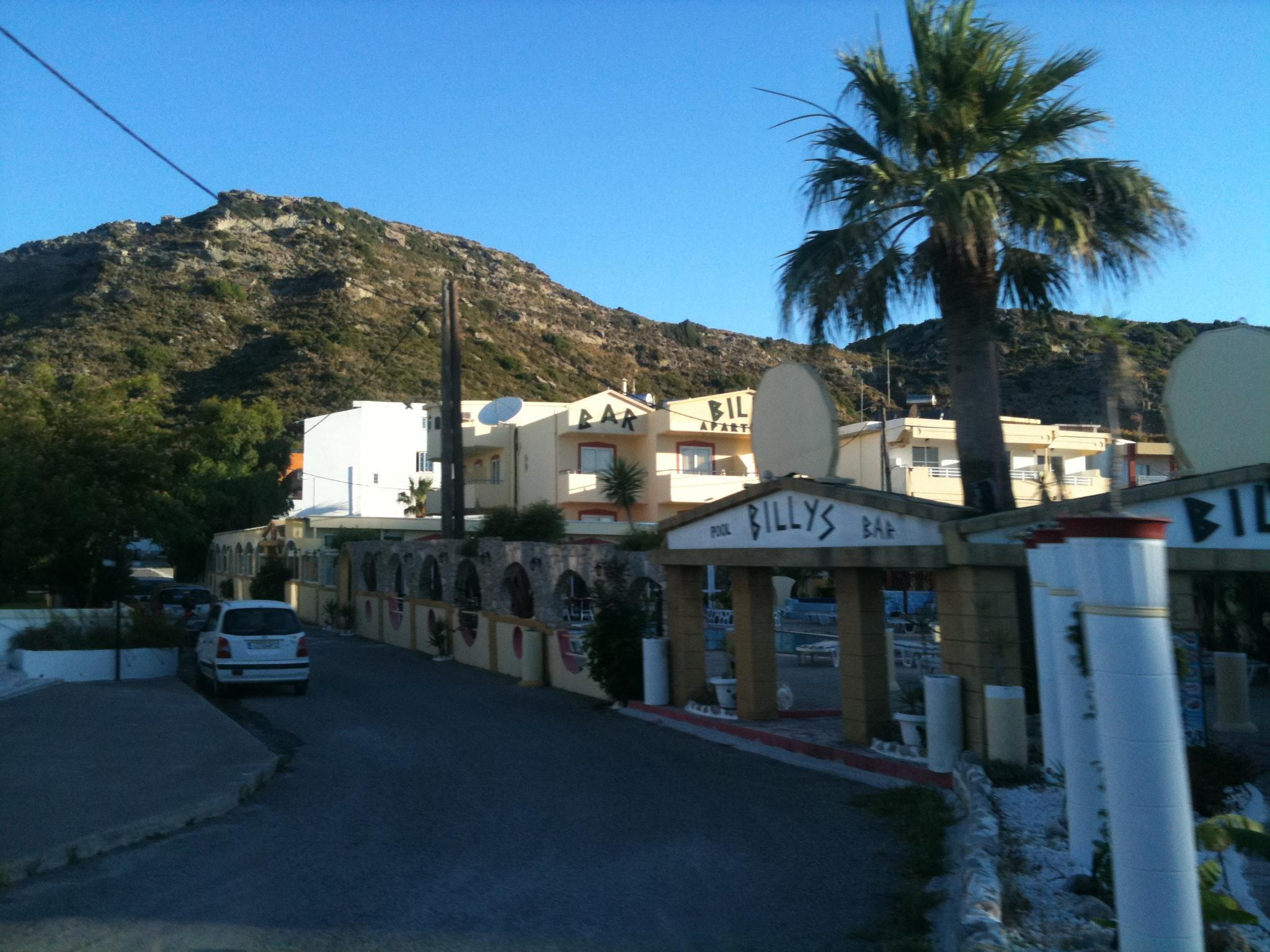
A street in Faliraki

Faliraki (Greek: Φαληράκι) is the primary seaside resort village on the Greek island of Rhodes, in the Dodecanese. It is situated on Faliraki Bay, on the northeastern coast, about 14 km south of the town of Rhodes and 10 km southeast of the airport. It is part of the municipal unit Kallithea.

== Tourism ==
Faliraki is a popular tourist destination with a 5 km stretch of sand and 12 FEE Blue Flags. At the southern end of Faliraki Beach there is an official naturist beach called Mandomata Beach, which has a small tavern as well as a couple of public toilets. Faliraki has rediscovered itself as a cosmopolitan, vibrant centre of tourism catering to many nationalities and all age groups. Faliraki boasts the largest water park in Greece, a state-of-the-art bowling park, a history park, and a fun-park for families and younger children. The centre of the town, particularly in July and August, is buzzing with younger children and families. As well as traditional Greek cuisine there are restaurants specialising in Chinese, Mexican, Italian and British cuisine. Along the beach front there are taverns, bars, restaurants, cafeterias and tourist shops. The fishing harbour of St. Apostolos is a hub of activity especially in the morning, whilst the fishing boats unload their catch, the day cruisers (direct to Lindos, Rhodes Town & beaches) depart and locals congregate for their coffee.
