= Rhodes (regional unit) =

Rhodes Περιφερειακή ενότητα Ρόδου
- Regional unit
- Municipalities of the Dodecanese

- Rhodes within Greece

- Location within Greece
- Coordinates: 36°10′N 28°0′E
- Country: Greece
- Administrative region: South Aegean
- Seat: Rhodes (city)

Area
  - Total: 1,587 km^{2} (613 sq mi)

Population (2021)
  - Total: 129,521
  - Density: 81.61/km^{2} (211.4/sq mi)
- Time zone: UTC+2 (EET)
  - Summer (DST): UTC+3 (EEST)

Rhodes (Greek: Περιφερειακή ενότητα Ρόδου) is one of the regional units of Greece. It is part of the region of South Aegean. The regional unit covers the islands of Rhodes, Chalki, Kastelorizo, Symi, Tilos and several smaller islands in the Aegean Sea.

== Administration ==
As a part of the 2011 Kallikratis government reform, the regional unit Rhodes was created out of part of the former Dodecanese Prefecture. It is subdivided into 5 municipalities. These are (number as in the map in the infobox):

- Chalki (15)
- Kastellorizo (Megisti, 10)
- Rhodes (Rodos, 1)
- Symi (13)
- Tilos (14)

== Province ==
The province of Rhodes (Greek: Επαρχία Ρόδου) was one of the provinces of the Dodecanese Prefecture. It had the same territory as the present regional unit. It was abolished in 2006.
