= South Aegean =

Administrative region of Greece

South Aegean Περιφέρεια Νοτίου Αιγαίου
- Administrative region
- Coordinates: 36.8°N 26.2°E
- Country: Greece
- Decentralized Administration: Aegean
- Capital: Ermoupoli
- Largest city: Rhodes
- Regional units: List: Andros; Kalymnos; Karpathos-Kasos; Kea-Kythnos; Kos; Milos; Mykonos; Naxos; Paros; Rhodes; Syros; Thira; Tinos

Government
  - Governor: Giorgos Hatzimarkos (New Democracy)

Area
  - Total: 5,286 km^{2} (2,041 sq mi)

Population (2021)
  - Total: 327,820
  - Density: 62.02/km^{2} (160.6/sq mi)

GDP
  - Total: €7.857 billion (2024)
  - Per capita: €24,028 (2024)
- Time zone: UTC+2 (EET)
  - Summer (DST): UTC+3 (EEST)
- ISO 3166 code: GR-L
- HDI (2023): 0.890 very high · 9th of 13
- Website: www.pnai.gov.gr

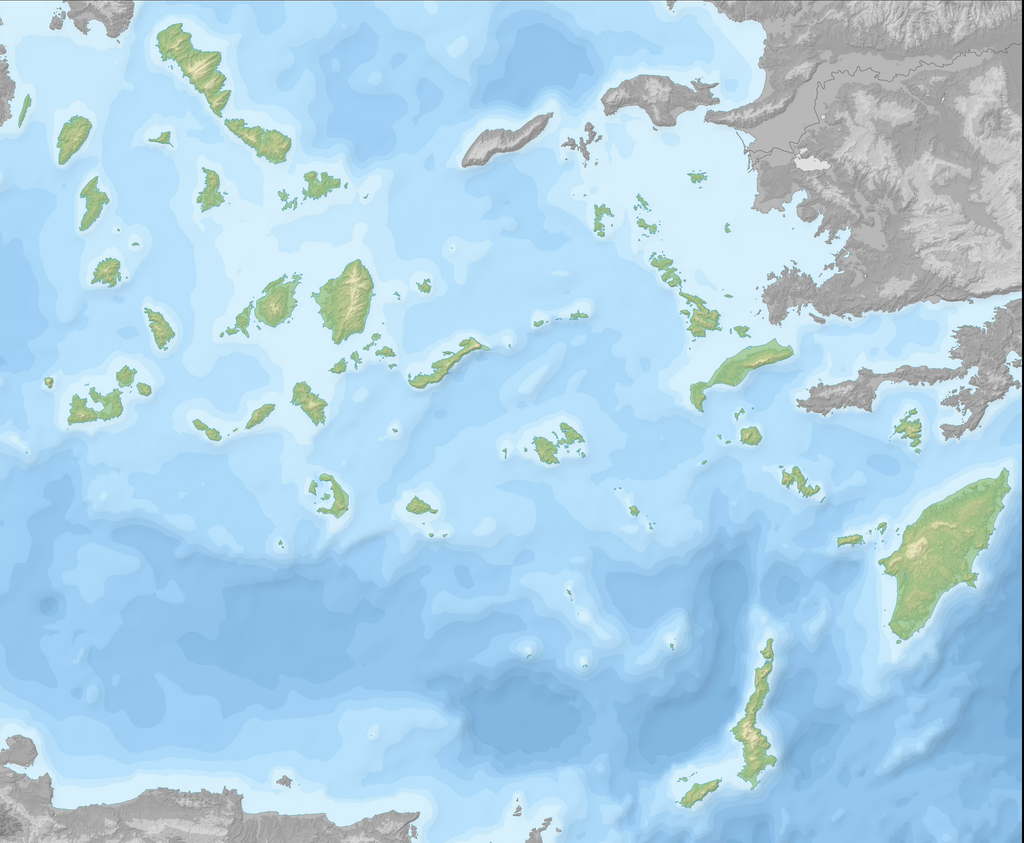
South Aegean topographic map

The South Aegean Region (Greek: Περιφέρεια Νοτίου Αιγαίου, romanized: Periféreia Notíou Aigaíou [periˈferia noˈtiu eˈʝeu]) is one of the thirteen administrative regions of Greece. It consists of the Cyclades and Dodecanese island groups in the central and southeastern Aegean Sea.

== Administration ==
The South Aegean region was established in the 1987 administrative reform. With the 2010 Kallikratis plan, its powers and authority were redefined and extended. Along with the North Aegean region, it is supervised by the Decentralized Administration of the Aegean based at Piraeus. The capital of the region is situated in Ermoupoli on the island of Syros. The administrative region includes 50 inhabited islands, including the popular tourism destinations of Mykonos, Santorini and Rhodes.

Until the Kallikratis reform, the region consisted of the two prefectures of the Cyclades (capital: Ermoupoli) and the Dodecanese (capital: Rhodes). Since 1 January 2011 it is divided into 13 regional units, formed around major islands:

- Andros
- Kalymnos
- Karpathos-Kasos
- Kea-Kythnos
- Kos
- Milos
- Mykonos
- Naxos
- Paros
- Rhodes
- Syros
- Thira (Santorini)
- Tinos

== Major communities ==
- Andros (Άνδρος)
- Ialysós (Ιαλυσός)
- Kallithéa (Καλλιθέα)
- Kálymnos (Κάλυμνος)
- Kárpathos (Κάρπαθος)
- Kos (Κως)
- Léros (Λέρος)
- Milos (Μήλος)
- Mýkonos (Μύκονος)
- Náxos (Νάξος)
- Páros (Πάρος)
- Petaloúdes (Πεταλούδες)
- Ródos (Ρόδος) (Rhodes in English)
- Santoríni (Σαντορίνη) or Thíra (Θήρα)
- Syros (Σύρου) including Ermoúpoli (Ερμούπολη)

== Demographics ==
The region was one in only two in Greece to grow in population between 2011 and 2021 along with Crete, adding a total of 15,527 people (increase of 5%). It overtook Epirus and is presently the 9th largest region by population in Greece.

== Economy ==
The Gross domestic product (GDP) of the province was 6.4 billion € in 2018, accounting for 3.5% of Greek economic output. GDP per capita adjusted for purchasing power was 22,400 € or 74% of the EU27 average in the same year. The GDP per employee was 79% of the EU average. South Aegean is the region in Greece with the second highest GDP per capita.
