= Panagia tou Kastrou =

Church in Rhodes, Greece

- Παναγία του Κάστρου
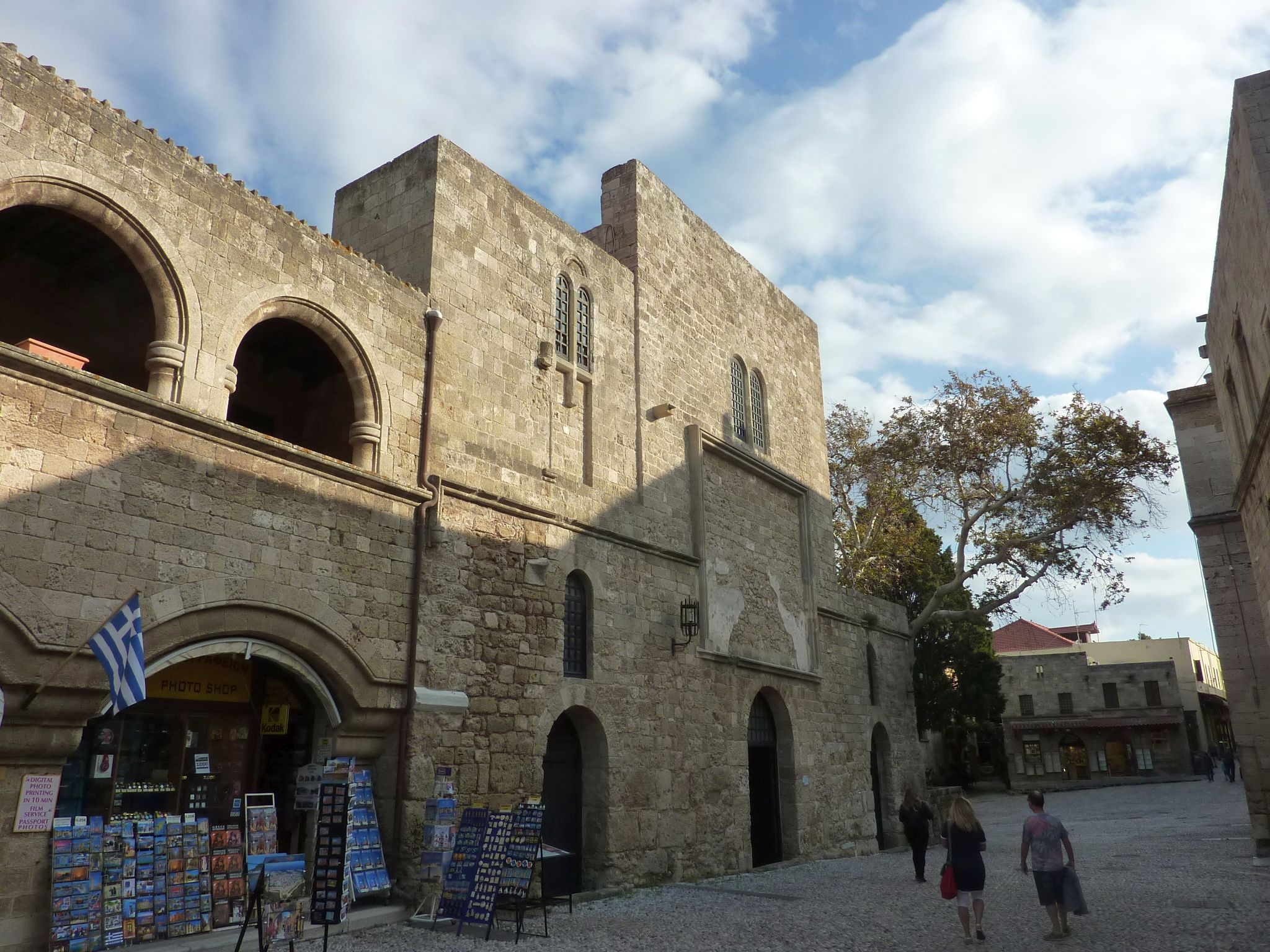
- The church facade in 2017

- Location of the church in Greece
- Panagia tou Kastrou
- 36°26′42″N 28°13′39″E
- Location: Street of the Knights, Old Town, Rhodes
- Country: Greece
- Language: Greek
- Denomination: Greek Orthodox
- Previous denomination: Greek Orthodox (11th century–c. 1310); Roman Catholic (c. 1310–1522); Islam (1522–1947)

History
- Status: Church (11th century–1522); Mosque (1522–1947); Church (since c. 1947– )

Architecture
- Functional status: Active
- Architectural type: Church; Basilica (since c. 1310)
- Style: Byzantine; Gothic
- Completed: 11th century

Specifications
- Materials: Brick; stone

Administration
- Metropolis: Rhodes

Panagia tou Kastrou (Greek: Παναγία του Κάστρου, romanized: Panagía tou Kástrou, lit. 'Panagia of the Castle'), also known as Our Lady of the Castle, is a medieval Greek Orthodox church in the medieval town of Rhodes, on the island of Rhodes, in the South Aegean region of Greece. It is located inside the old walled city, and it is the largest surviving Byzantine church on the island. It has historically served as a Roman Catholic church and a Muslim mosque throughout its history, as Rhodes was conquered by various states and empires.

== History ==
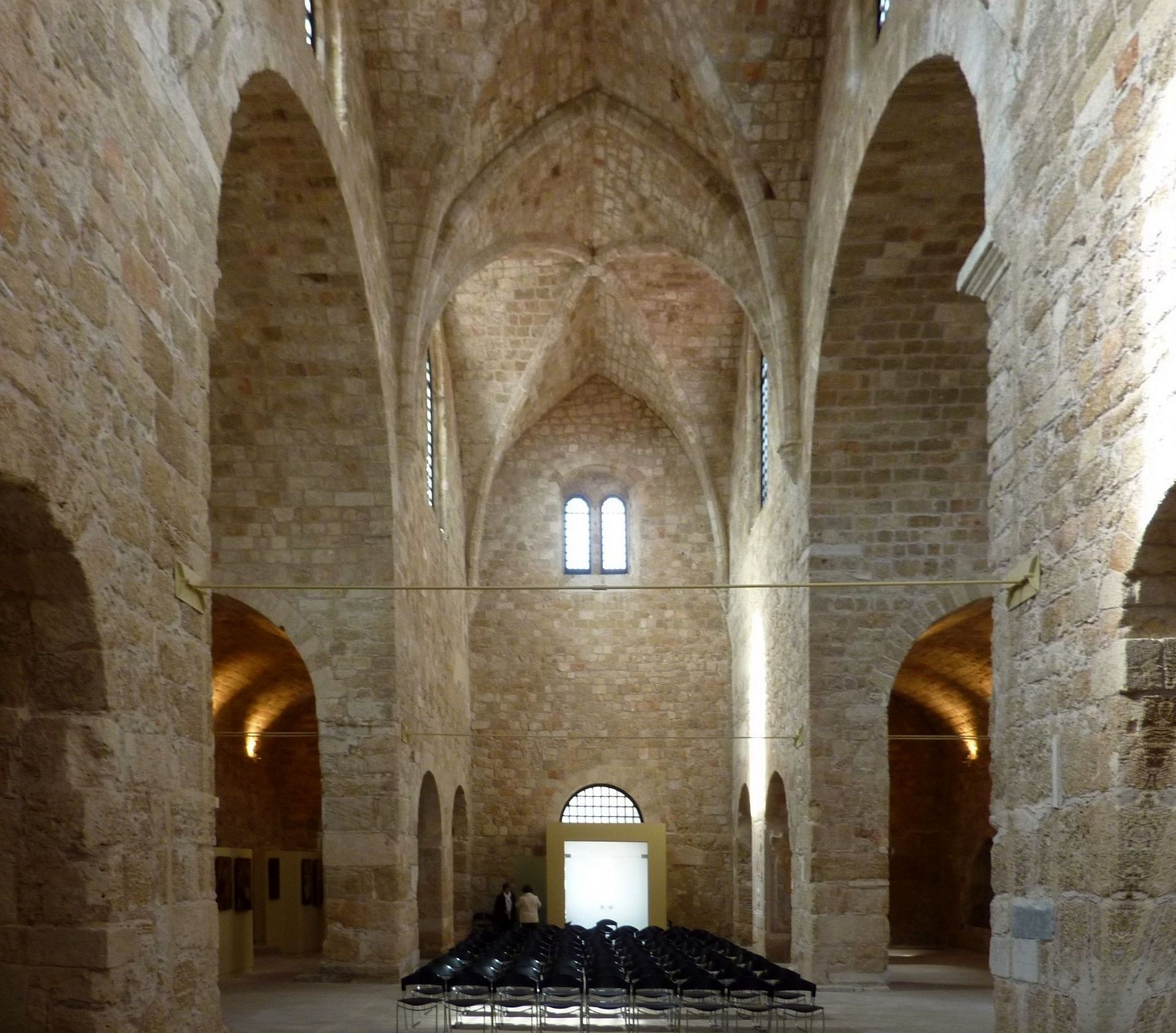
The interior

Panagia tou Kastrou was built as a Greek Orthodox church around the eleventh century.

After the capture of Rhodes by the Knights Hospitaller, the Byzantine Orthodox church was converted into a Roman Catholic church and archiepiscopal cathedral of the Latins, also dedicated to Virgin Mary, under the name Sancta Maria Castelli Rodi.

The Byzantine church was remodeled sometime in the first half of the 14th century; this was likely is due to a repair due to the possible collapse of the middle nave with the dome during the earthquake of 1303. The archdiocese of Rhodes was in great poverty at the time, and could not afford the reconstruction of the church. Thus the help of Pope John XXII was asked, who seems to have provided funds for the church. In honour of his contribution they placed his coat of arms next to that of the Hospitaller Grand Master Hélion de Villeneuve.

The church seems to have obtained yet another intervention by the Knights, which is dated around the second half of the 15th century and is probably connected to the siege of 1480, during which Panagia tou Kastrou suffered extensive damage. Supporting this dating is the coat of arms of Grand Master Pierre d'Aubusson (1476-1503) within a glass case, accompanied by the coats of arms of earlier Grand Masters, Antoni de Fluvian and Jean Bonpart de Lastic, as tribute, apparently for their contributions to restorations.

After the island fell to the Ottomans Turks in 1522, it was converted into a mosque, called Enderun Mosque (Turkish: Enderun Camii) and it remained so until after World War II, when the Italians who held Rhodes at the time ceded the island to Greece in 1947 under the Treaty of Paris. Afterwards, the portico and the minaret were removed and it was converted back into a Christian church.

== Architecture ==
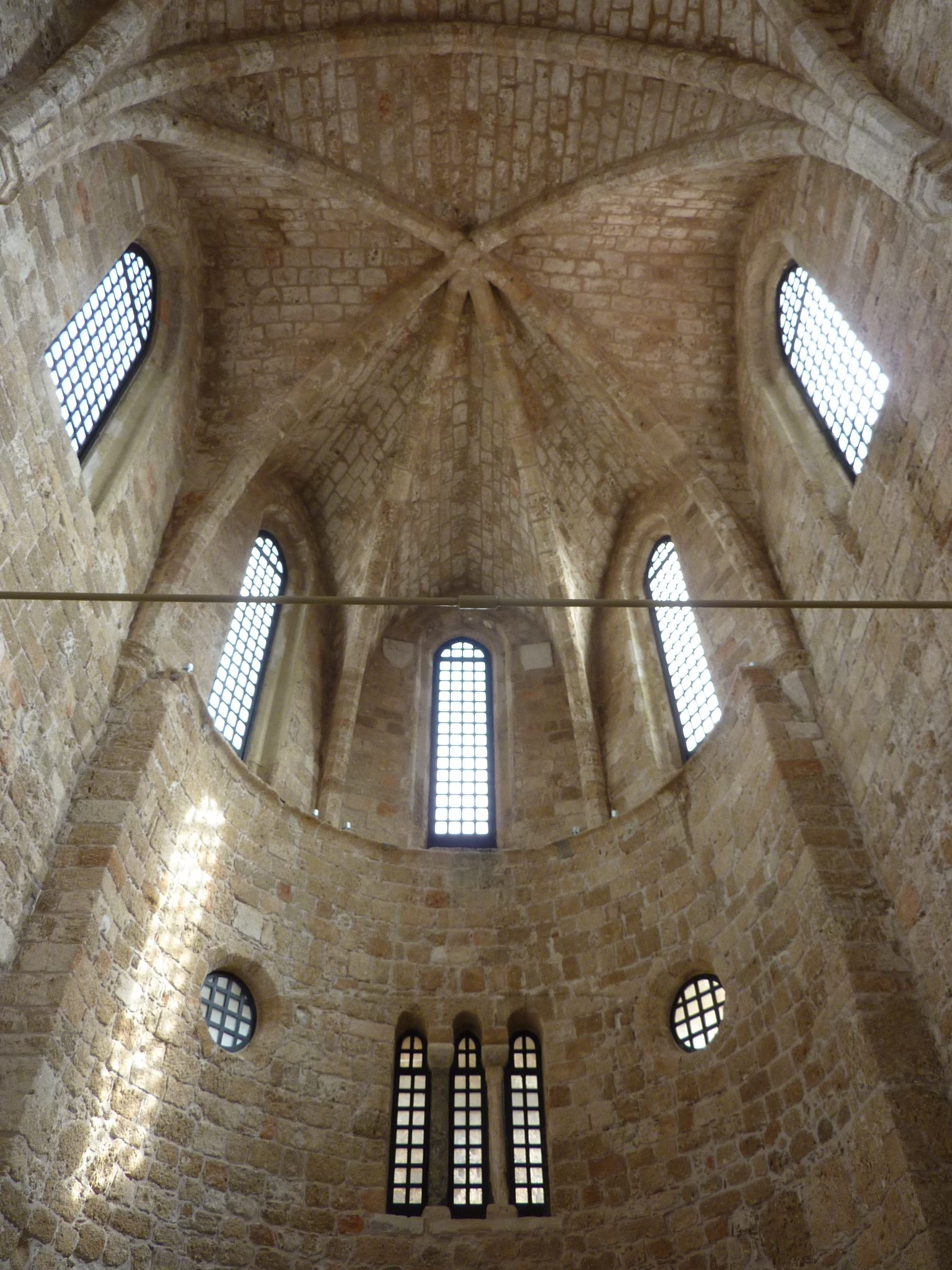
Gothic details.

It is the oldest and largest surviving Byzantine church inside the medieval town of Rhodes.

The church of Panagia tou Kastrou is located at the eastern end of the Street of the Knights, in the Kollakio of the medieval city, near the seaport. The original core of the building was a cruciform inscribed with dome type; this architectural style is evident until approximately the genesis of arches. After the capture of Rhodes by the Knights Hospitaller, the Byzantine church was remodeled and took the form of a three-aisled Gothic basilica with a transversal aisle.

The eastern side of the temple adjoins the sea fortification and is formed externally into a tower with rectangular ramparts. This tower can be viewed from the outside the walls, not far from the Arnaldo Gate. On the west side, above the central entrance door, a large rectangular frame is preserved, which would have housed a painted composition, that is now lost, with the subject of Virgin Mary surrounded by saints and knights.

During the period of Ottoman Turkish rule on the island and its conversion to a mosque, a portico was built and a minaret was erected on the south side for its new function as a mosque for Islamic worship; both elements were later removed by the Italians during the restoration works. A fountain dating to 1881 was also added in the courtyard outside the church.

Few traces of the church's painted decoration remain. A mural depicting Virgin Mary with the Child and a pair of saints is found on the north-west dome-supporting column (around the second quarter of the fourteenth century) and the figure of Saint Lucia on the southern wall, probably the work of a Western European artist (after c. 1350).

== Gallery ==
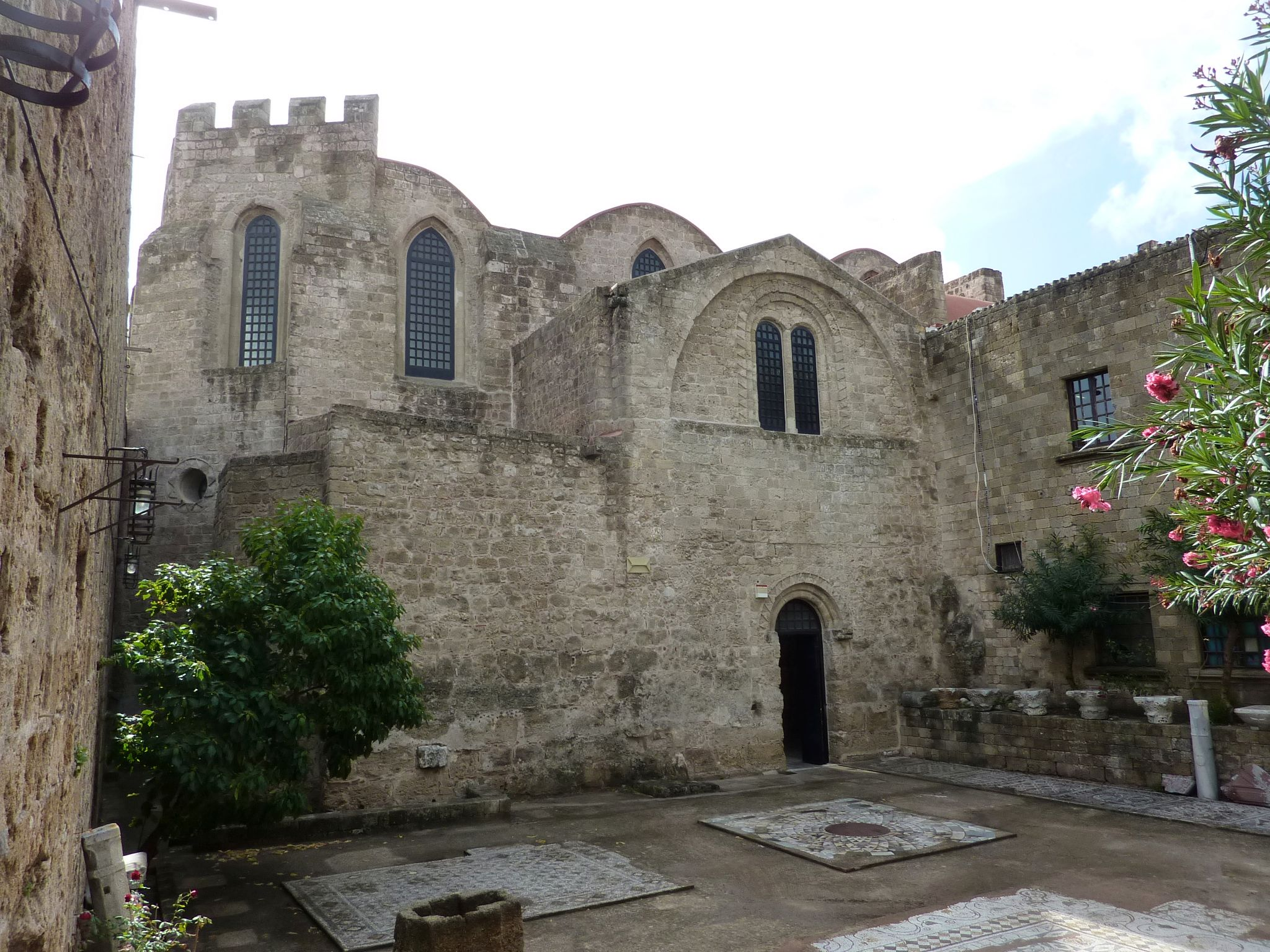
The church

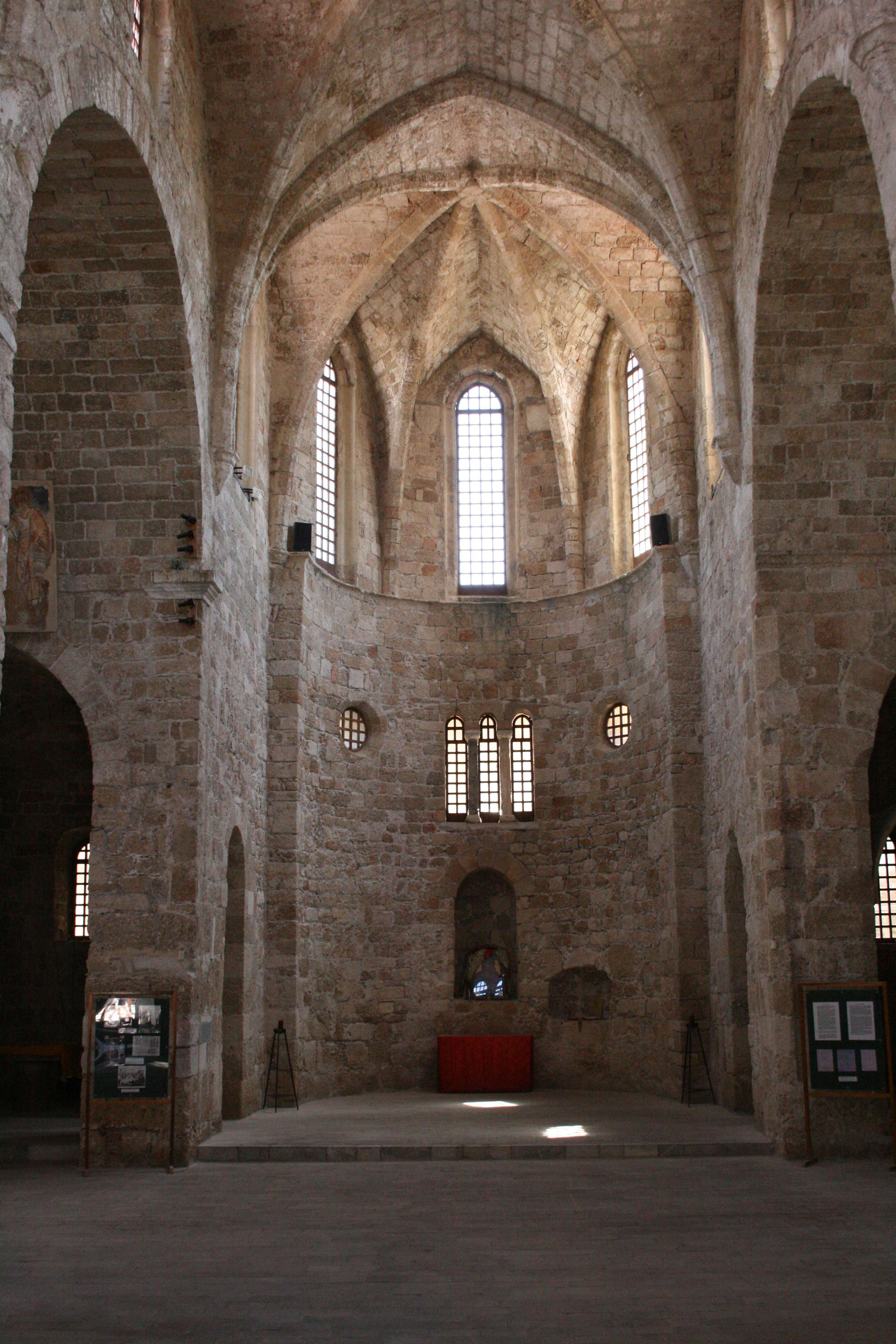
Interior

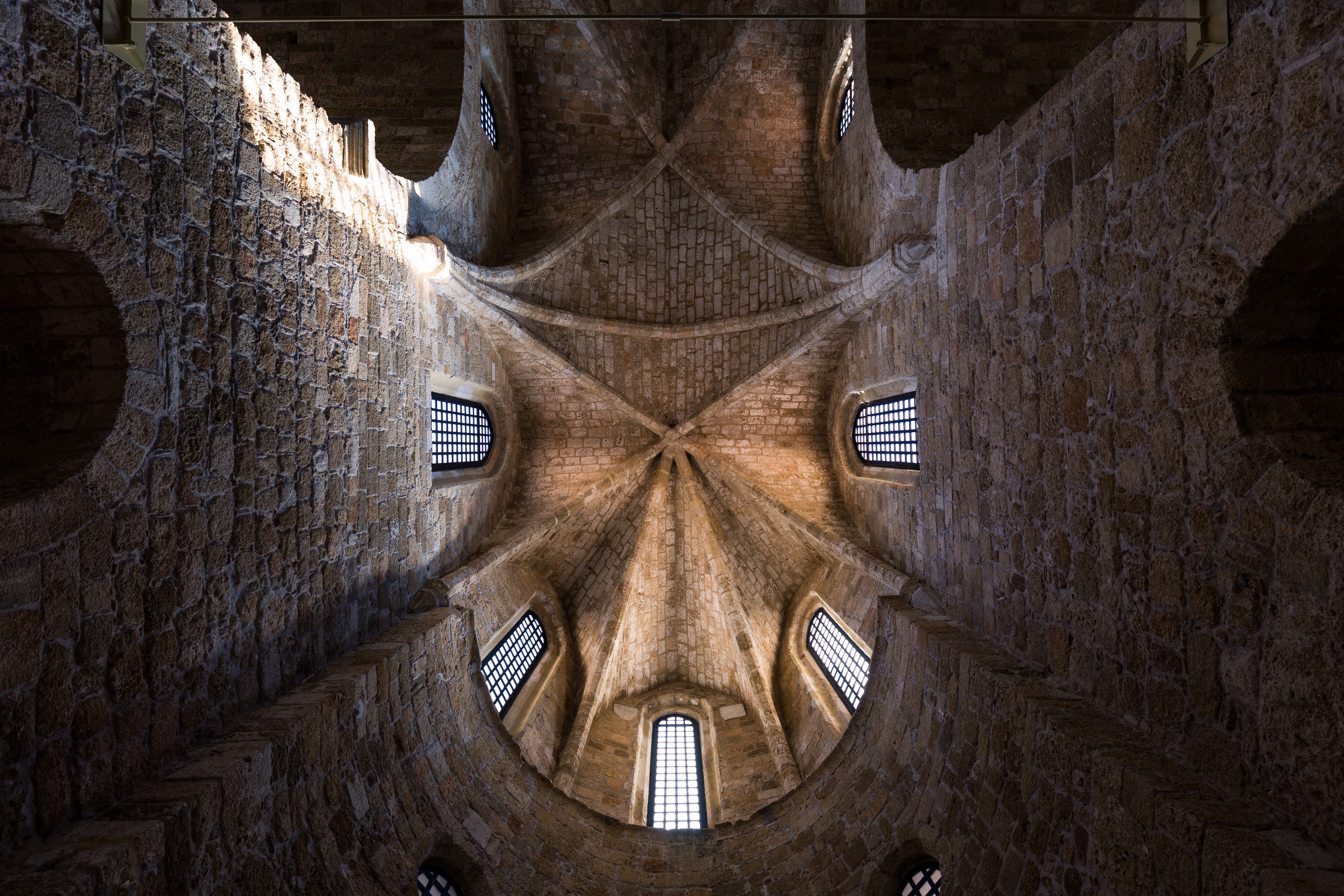
The vaulted ceiling

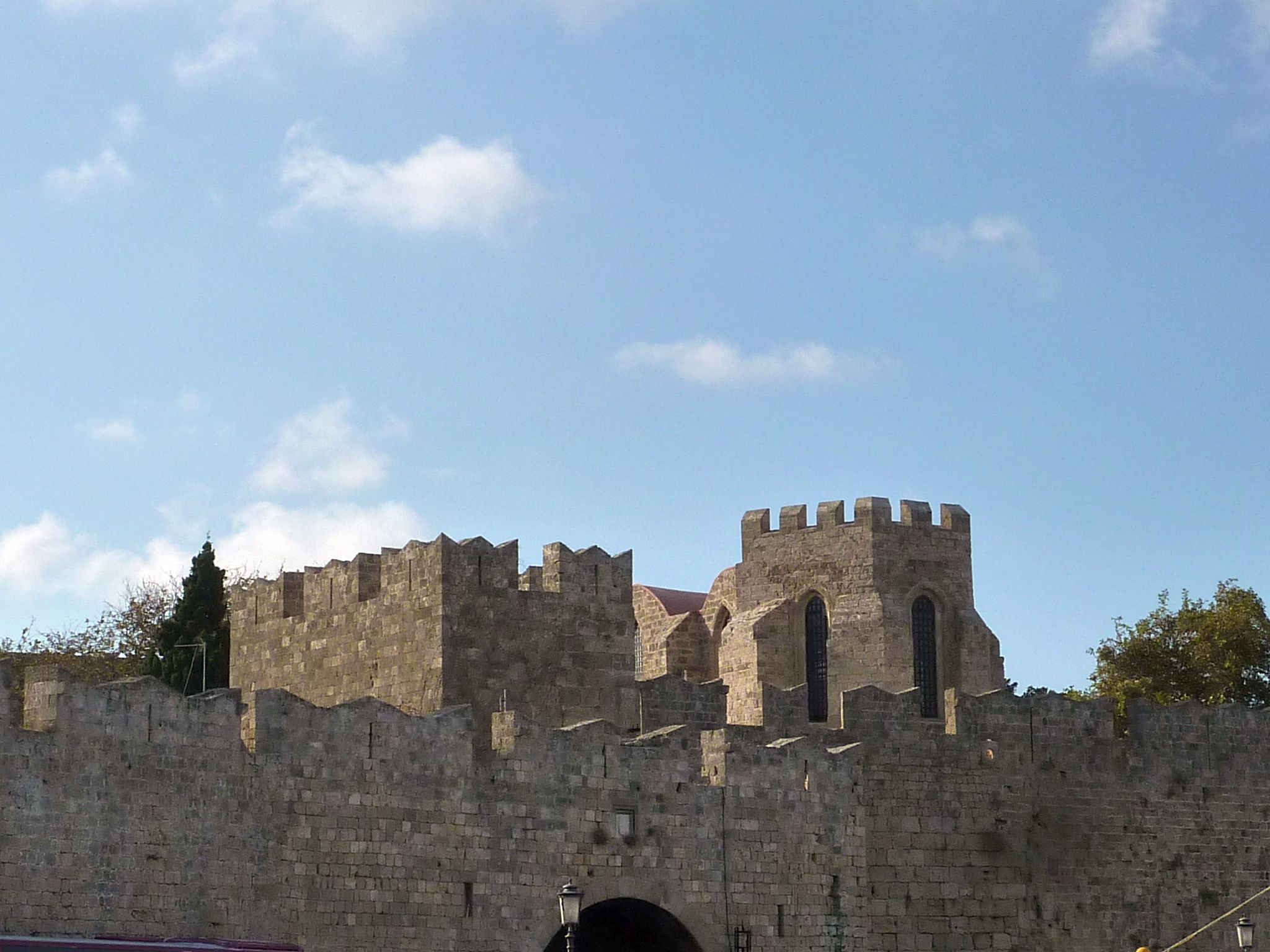
As seen from outside the medieval town walls

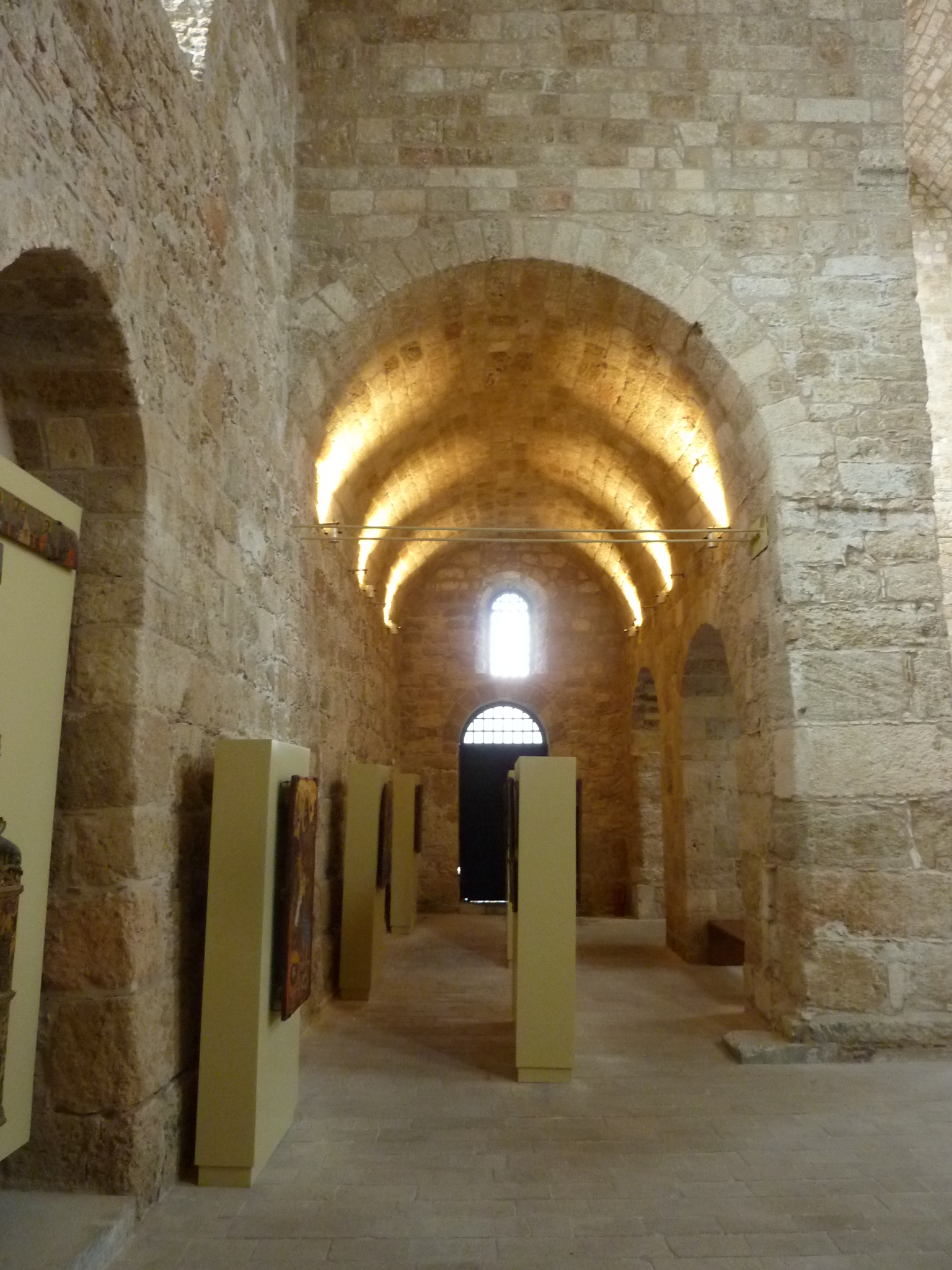
Corridor

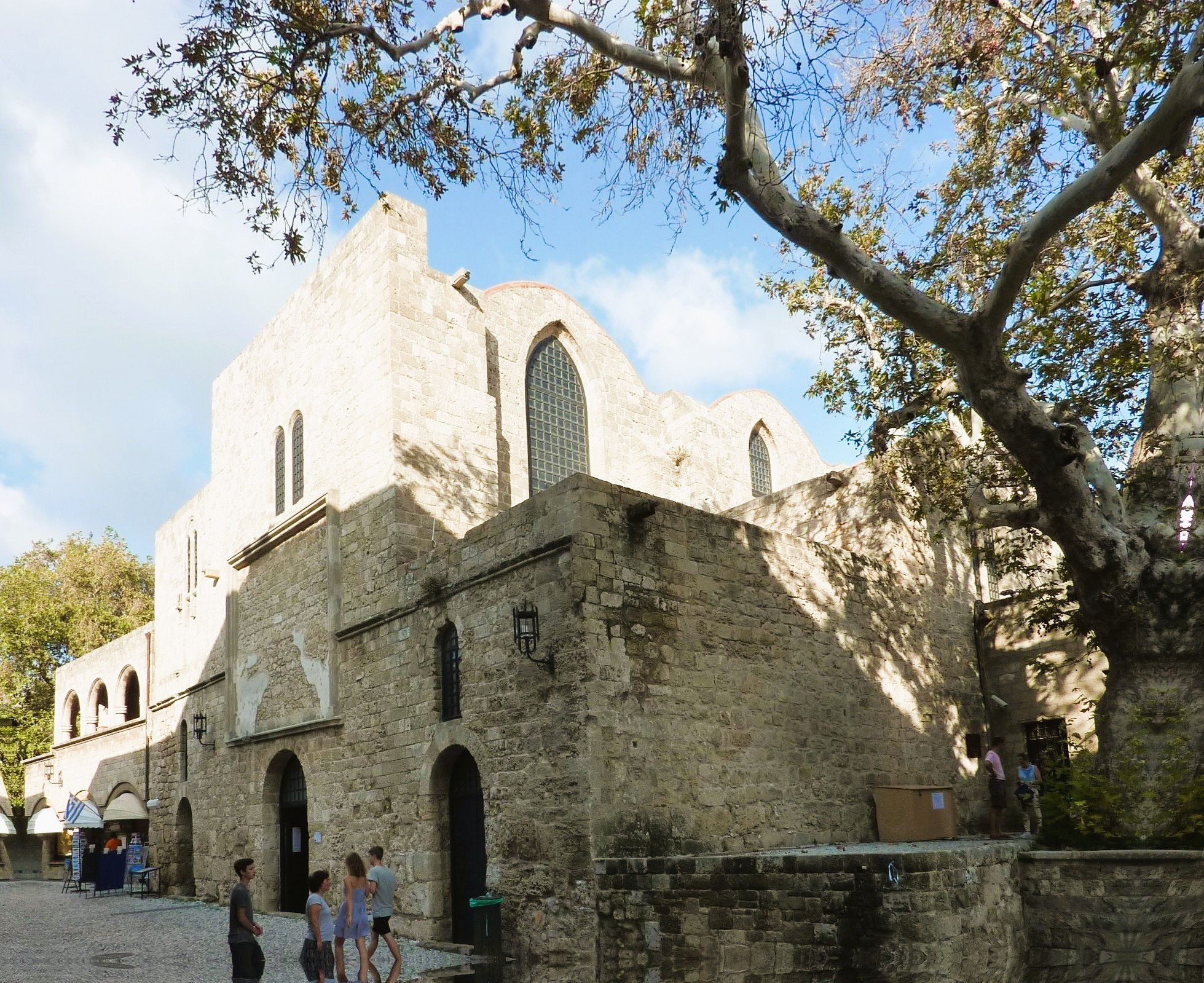
Outside view

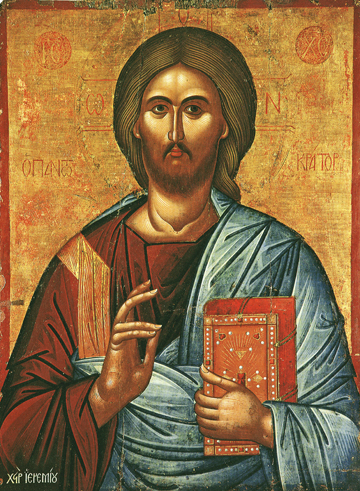
Christ Pantocrator by Ieremias Palladas, 17th c.

== See also ==
- Conversion of non-Islamic places of worship into mosques
- Hospitaller Rhodes
- List of former mosques in Greece
- Ottoman Greece
