= Archaeological Museum of Rhodes =

Museum in Rhodes, Greece

- Αρχαιολογικό Μουσείο Ρόδου
- Exterior of the museum and the central courtyard

- Location within Greece
- Established: 1914
- Location: Medieval City of Rhodes, Rhodes, Greece
- Coordinates: 36.4446°N 28.2272°E

The Archaeological Museum of Rhodes (Greek: Αρχαιολογικό Μουσείο Ρόδου) is located within the Medieval City of Rhodes, inside the edifice that was the hospital of the Knights Hospitaller. Construction began in 1440 and was brought to completion in the time of the Grand Master d'Aubusson. The museum contains collections of archaeological artifacts from various parts of Rhodes and the neighbouring islands, including the Statue of the Crouching Aphrodite, which was inspired by a famous prototype work created by the sculptor Doidalsas in the 3rd century BC, and the Pyxis of the Fikellura type.

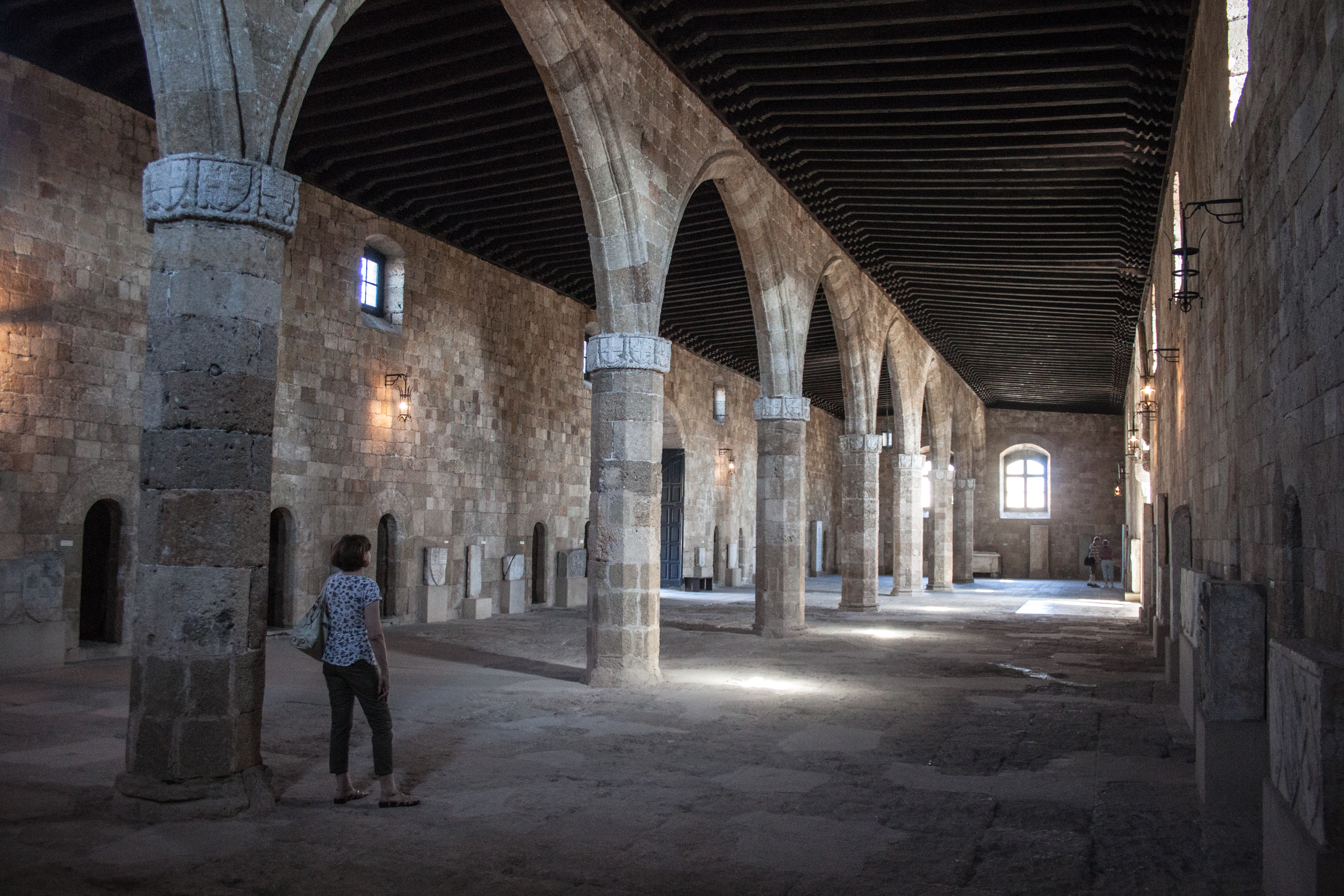
View of the main hall

The museum also holds the Head of Helios, which was featured in 2011 on the album cover of Floral Shoppe by Macintosh Plus, and subsequently became famous for its association with the Vaporwave aesthetic.

== Gallery ==
Museum interior

Mosaic collection in the museum's garden

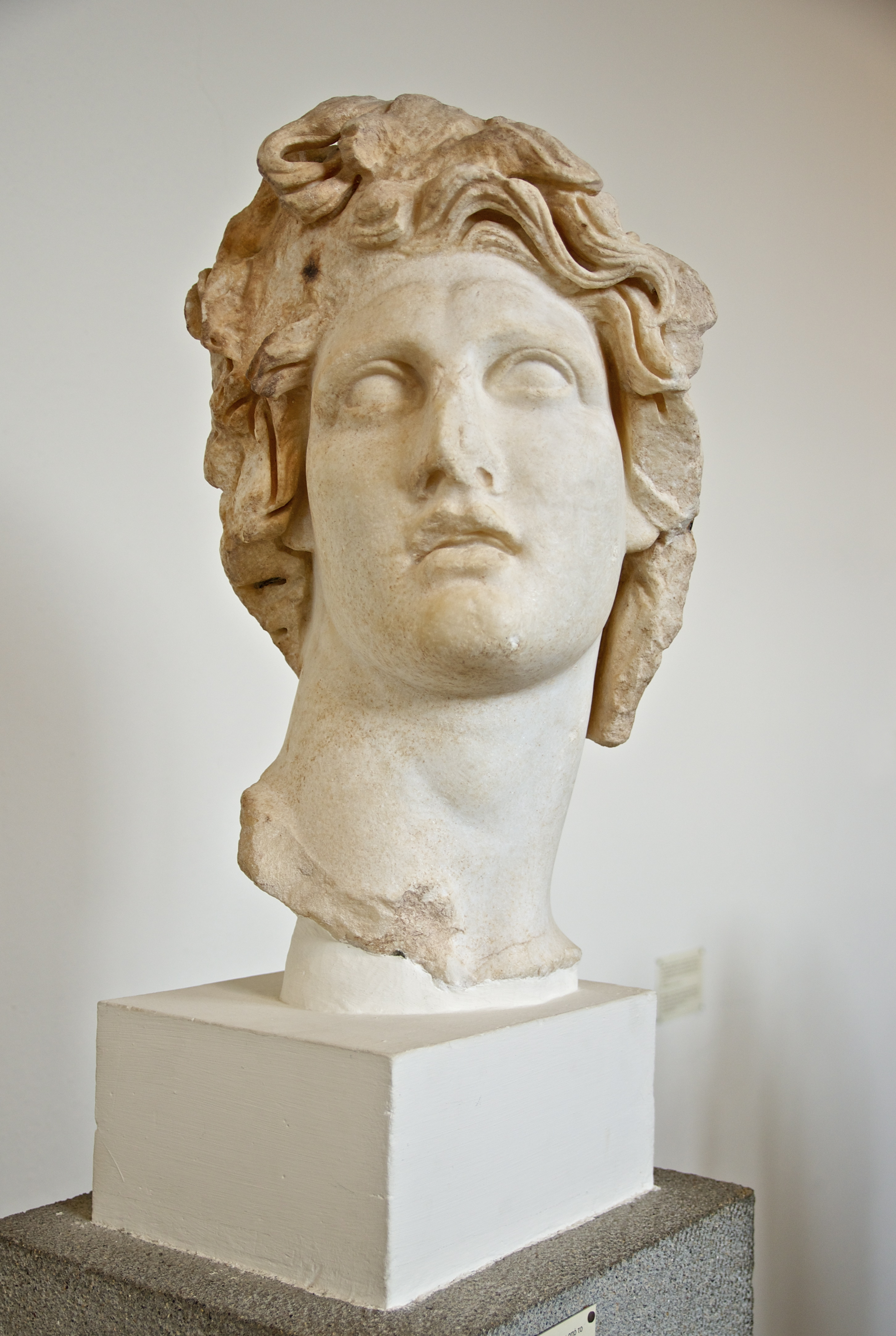
Marble head of Helios

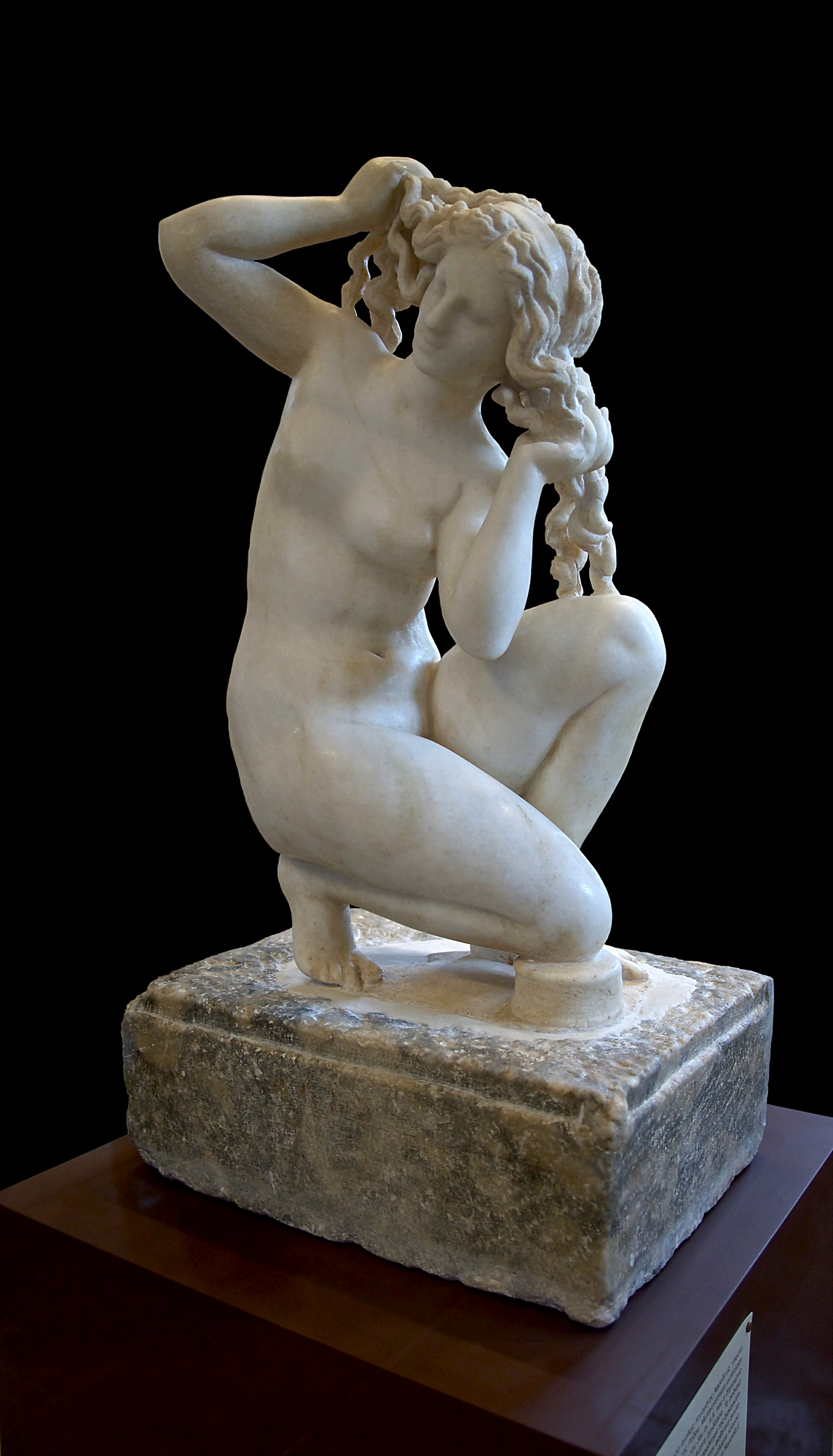
Aphrodite of Rhodes (crouching Venus)

Statue of Asclepius

Statue of a warrior enveloped by a snake

Marble relief featuring a late Hellenistic hunting scene

Rhodian plate featuring a sphinx, from the Pithos burial of an infant

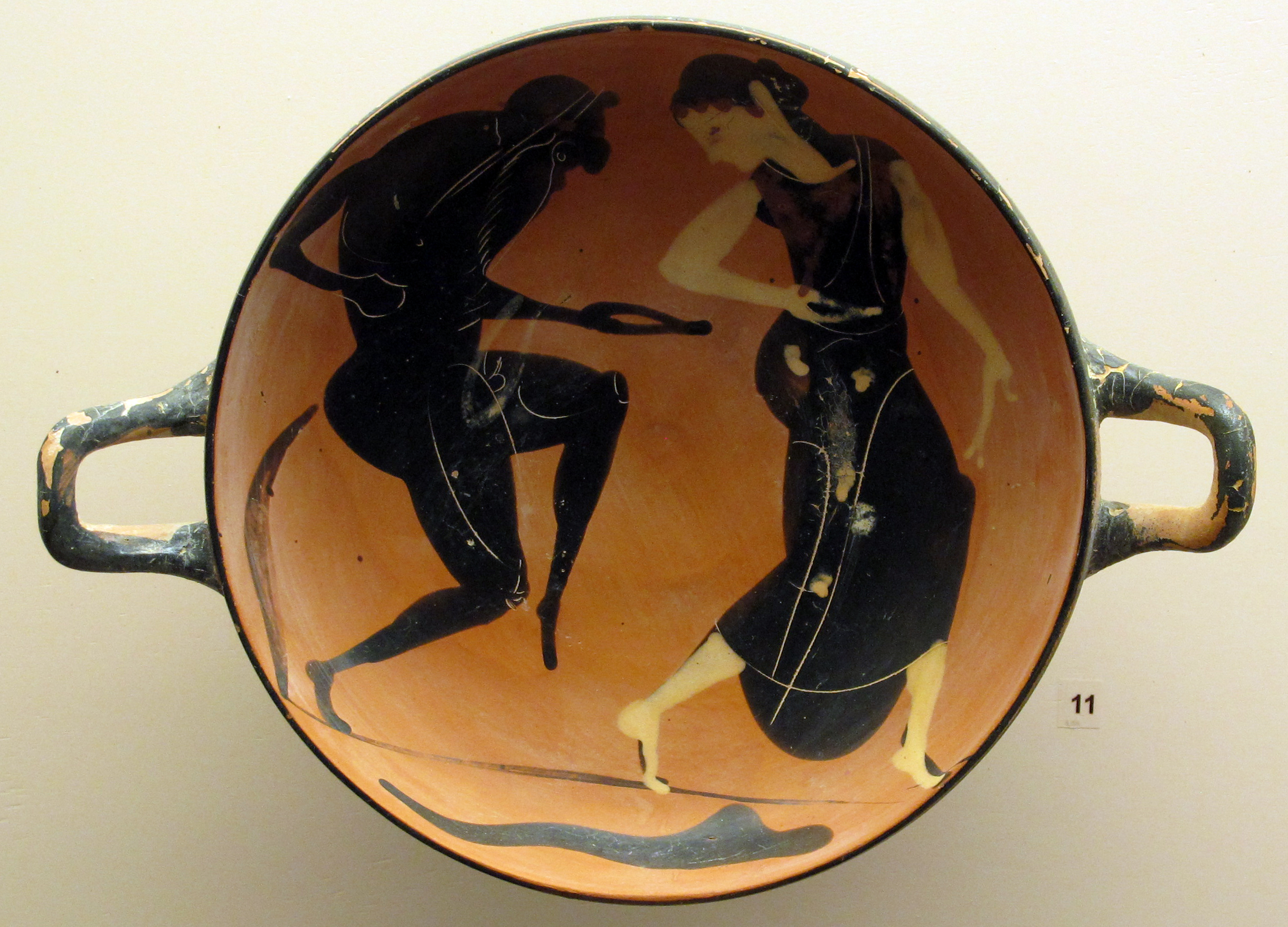
Pottery featuring a dancing satyr and maenad

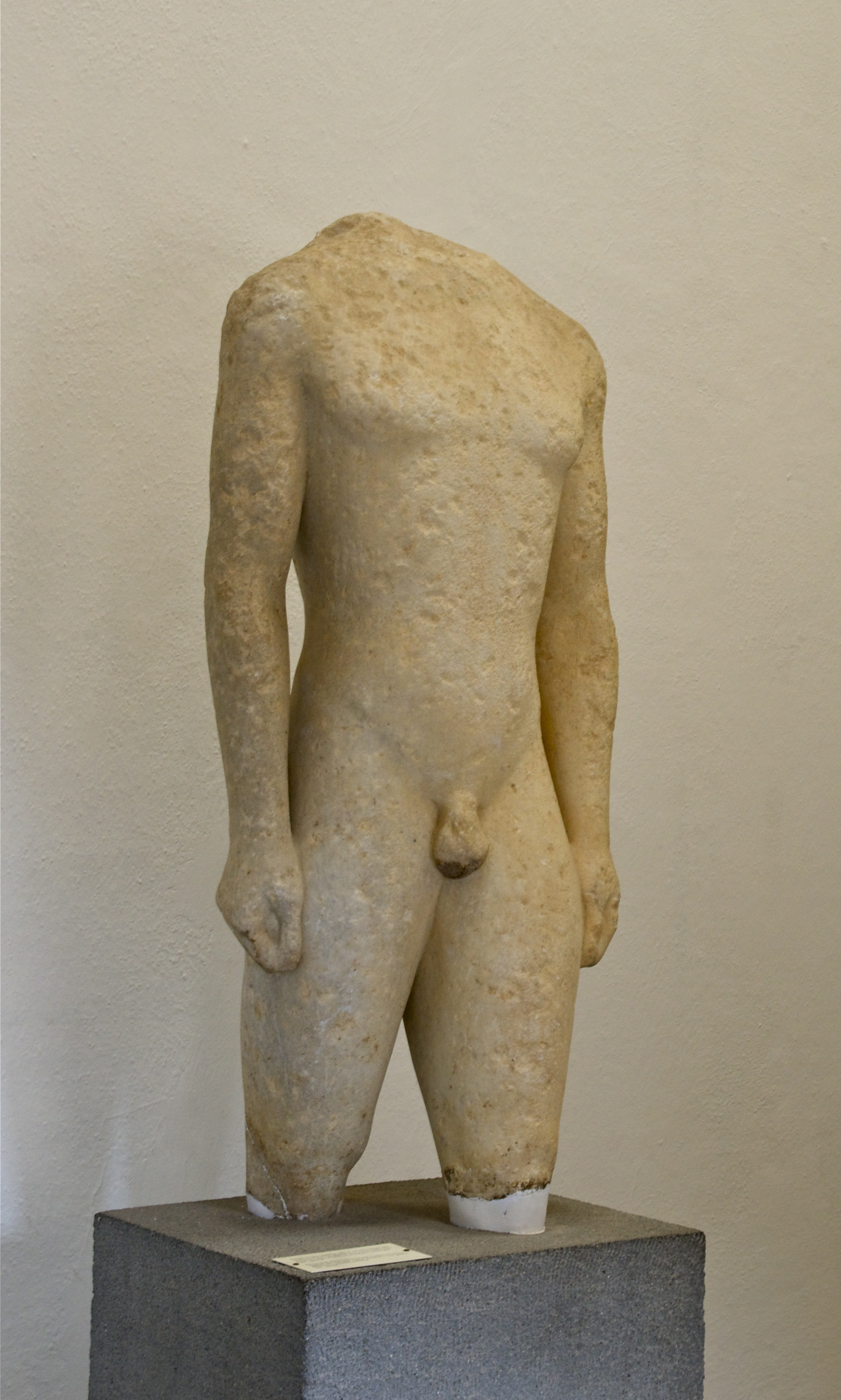
A kouros statue

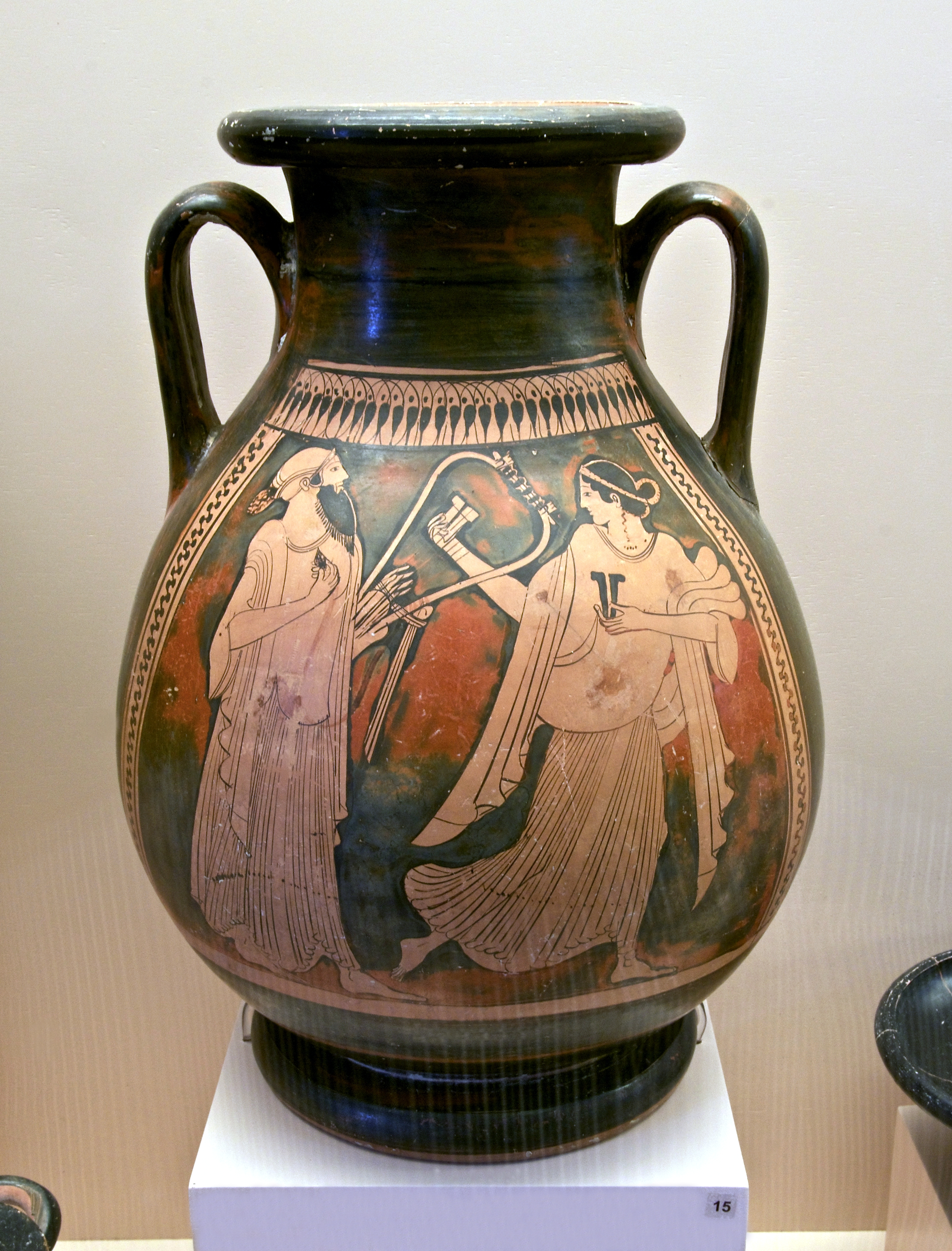
Attic red-figured pelike, from the tomb of an infant, featuring a man with a lyre and a woman with clappers

Exhibitions from the geometric period

Statue of Aphrodite

Mosaic depicting a centaur

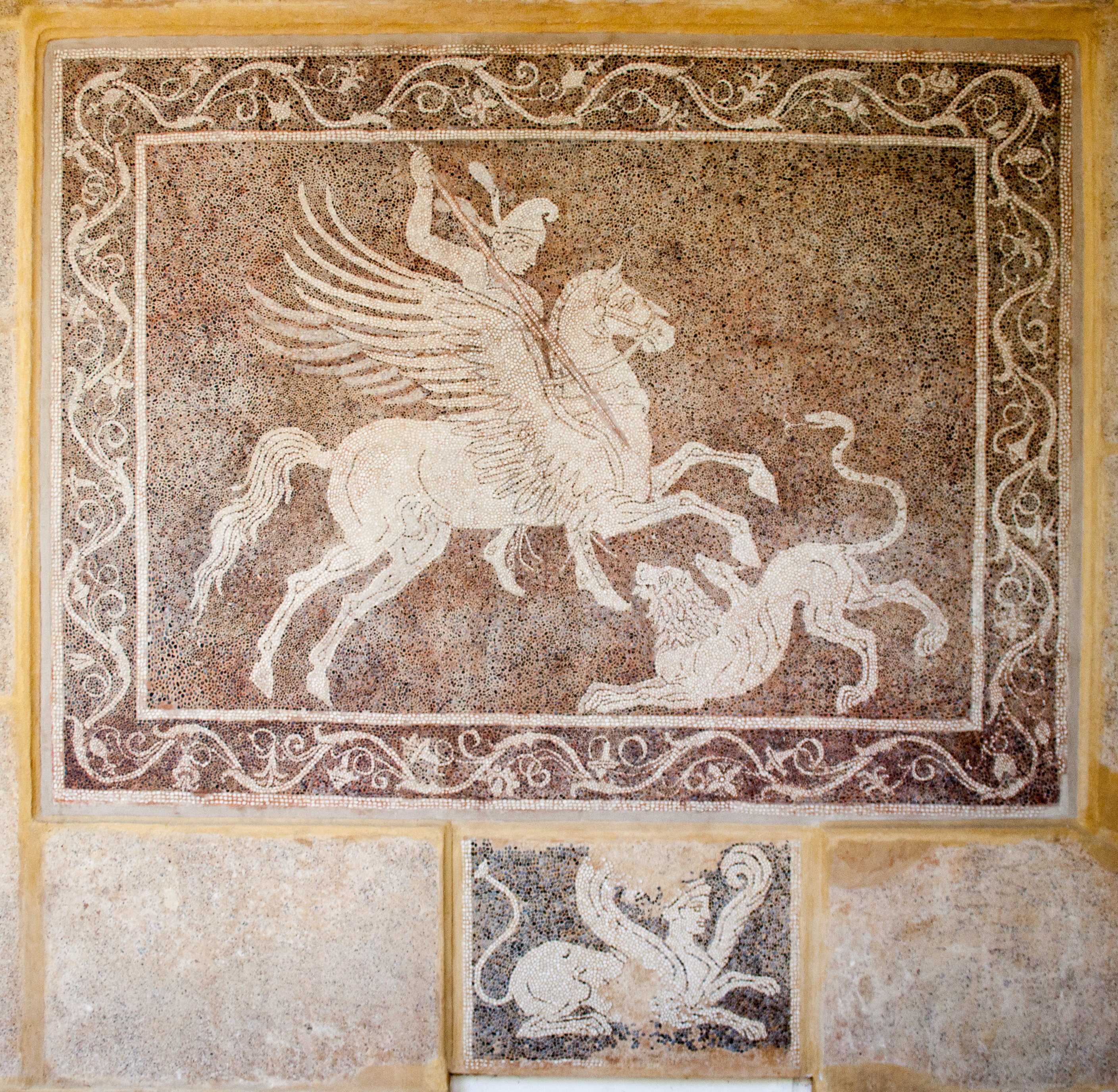
A Hellenistic Greek pebble mosaic floor depicting Bellerophon riding Pegasus while killing the Chimera, dated 300–270 BC

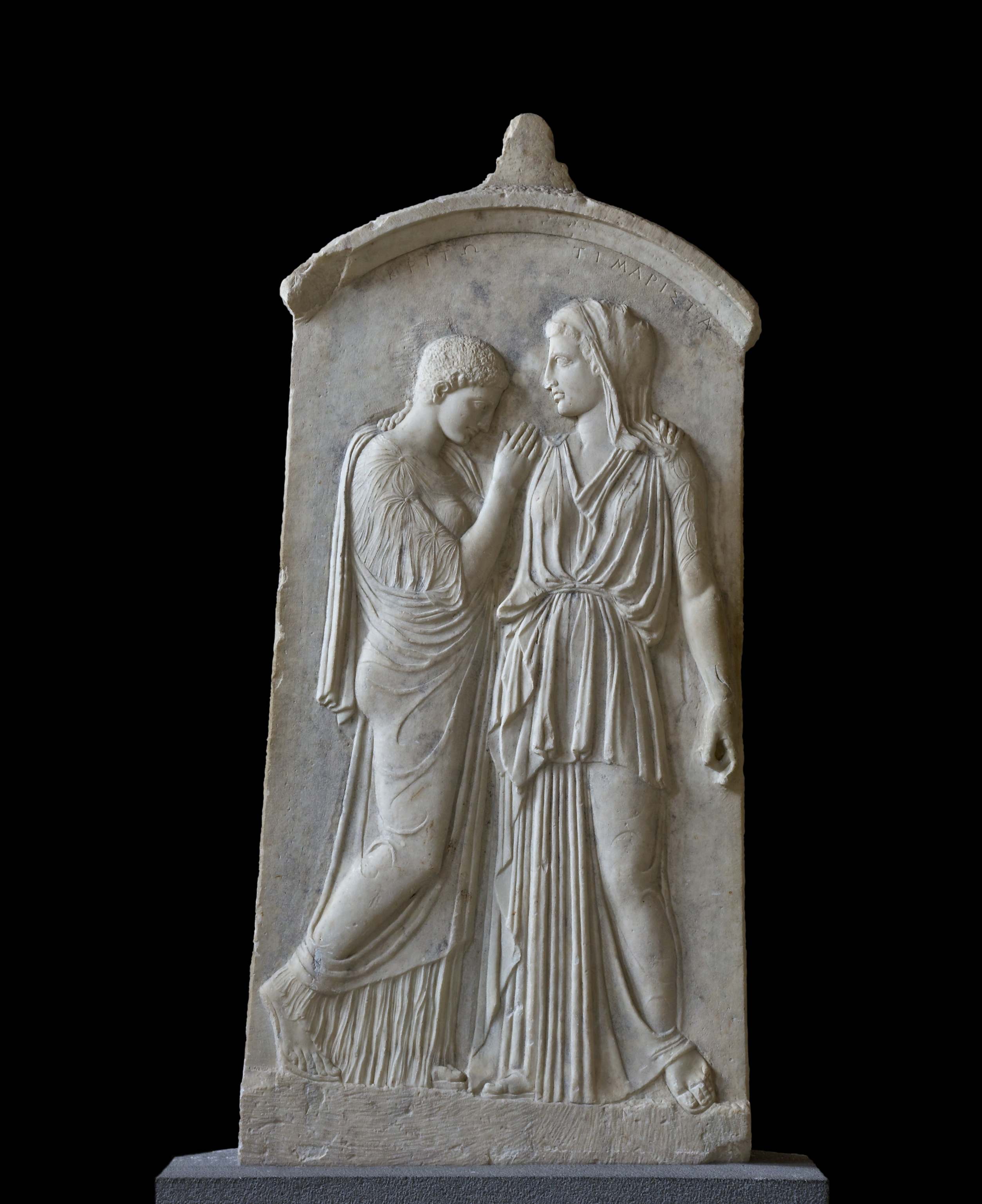
Grave relief of Krito and her mother Timarista embracing, found in the cemetery at Kameiros

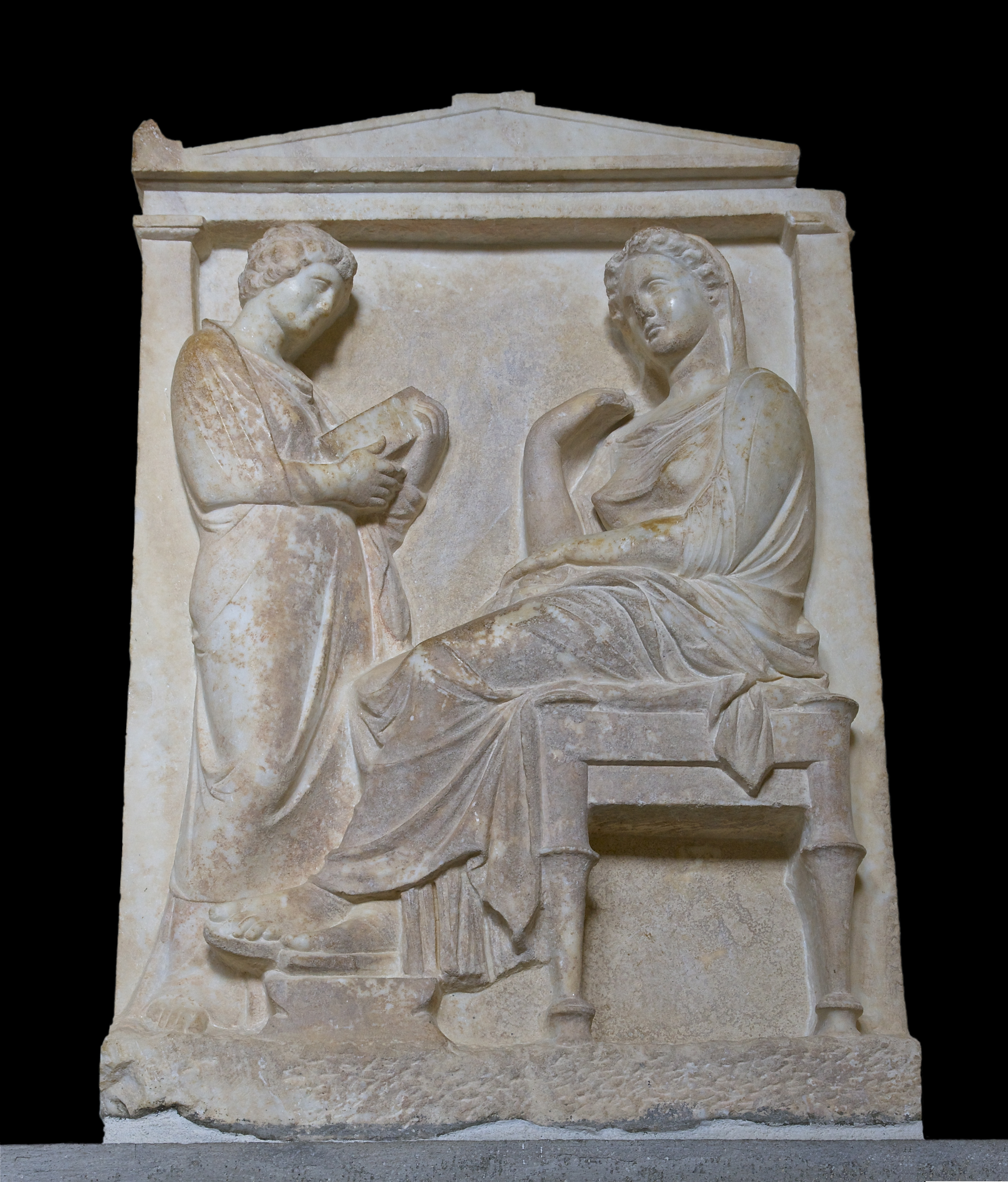
Grave stele of Kalliarista, found at Anatipsi. The dead womean sits on a diphros and her servant stands opposite, holding the casket with her jewels. Inscribed on the epistyle is the epigram: If there is a highest praise in the world beffiting a woman, with this died Kalliarista, daughter of Phileratos, for wisdom and virtue. For this reason her husband Damocles set up this stele as a memorial of love; and may a benevolent spirit follow him for the rest of his life.
