= Aphrodite of Rhodes =

Statue of Aphrodite in Rhodes, Greece

- Greek: Αφροδίτη της Ρόδου
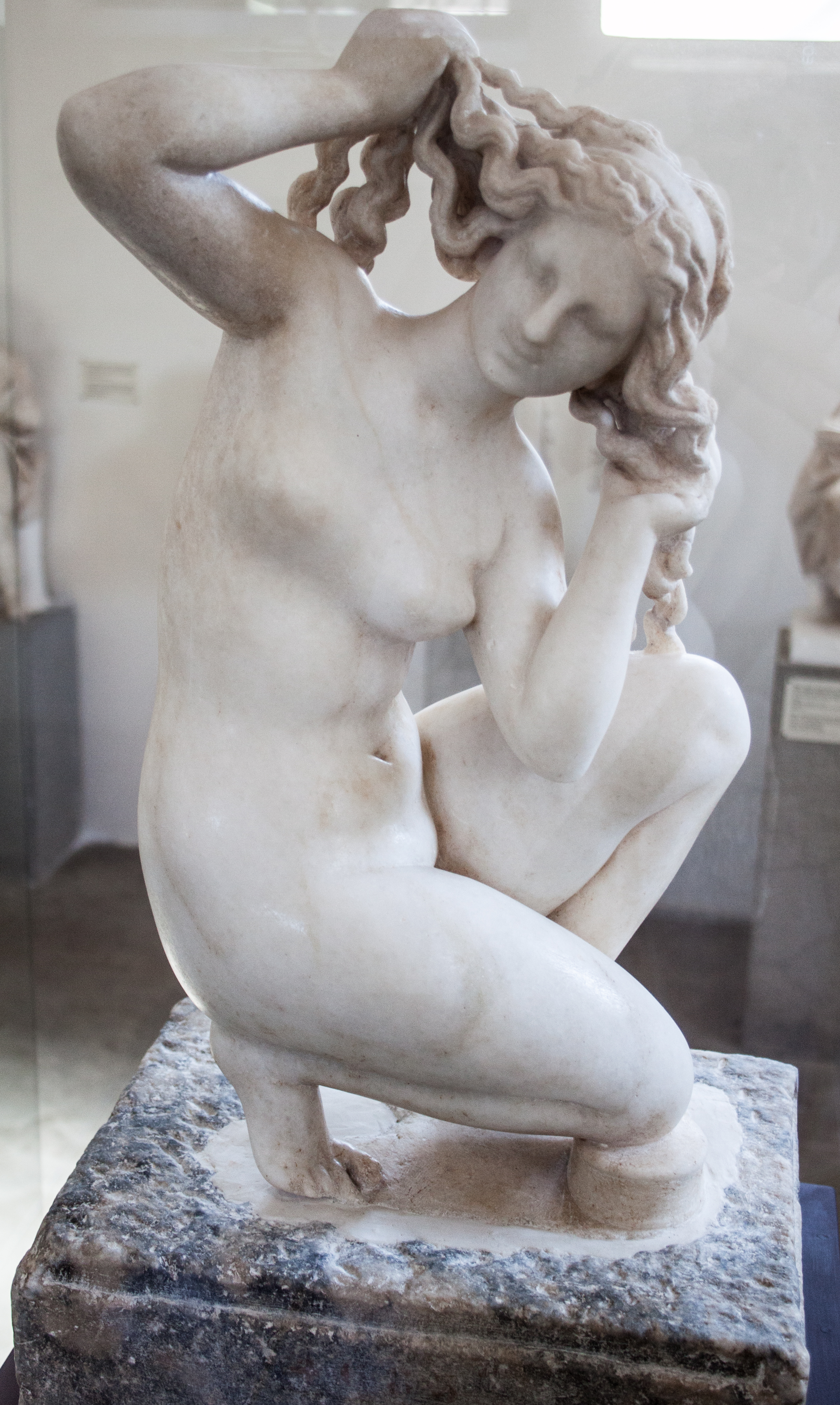
- Aphrodite of Rhodes behind glass.
- Year: 2nd-1st century BC
- Catalogue: No 4685
- Medium: Marble
- Movement: Hellenistic
- Subject: Aphrodite crouching
- Dimensions: 61 cm (24 in)
- Condition: Single piece, intact
- Location: Archaeological Museum of Rhodes, Rhodes

The Aphrodite of Rhodes (Greek: Αφροδίτη της Ρόδου) also known as the Crouching Venus of Rhodes is a marble sculpture of the Greek goddess Aphrodite housed in the Archaeological Museum of Rhodes in Rhodes, Greece. It depicts Aphrodite in the crouching Venus pose, where the goddess crouches her right knee close to the ground and turns her head to the right. It is considered to be one of the most important hallmarks of Rhodes today.

== History ==
Aphrodite of Rhodes was an accidental find, unearthed in 1923 in the garden of the Governor's villa in Rhodes, when the island was still under Italian control following Italy's annexation of the Dodecanese islands from the Ottoman Empire in 1912.

== Description ==
Crouching Venuses were used from the Hellenistic period onwards to adorn houses by the wealthy. This type of statues ultimately derives from a lost Greek original of the third century BC which was attributed to a sculptor named Doedalsas of Bithynia (a region in northwest Anatolia). Typically, a Crouching Venus will show the goddess kneeling after bathing, looking at her right after being alarmed, usually trying to conceal her nakedness with her hands. The Aphrodite of Rhodes shows a unique variation where the goddess, rather than trying to hide her form in modesty, lifts her hair in her fingers to dry it, and looks out at the viewer openly displaying her breasts.

It is a small and elegant sculpture, representative sample of the light rhythm, which flourished in the late Hellenistic times and is conventionally dubbed "Hellenistic Rococo". Aphrodite of Rhodes is preserved intact with a very well polished surface, which gives the impression of porcelain. In accordance with the style of the time, not a lot of anatomical details are shown.

Built around the second or first century BC, the marble statue is 49 cm in height (or about 1/2 life-size), with an additional 12 cm-tall base (or 61 cm in total). The base, although ancient, probably did not belong originally to this sculpture, and the crystalline-white marble was probably sourced from the island of Paros. The statue is almost intact, with the exception of some chips in the hair's locks in the rear, and some abrasions on the toes, especially those of the left foot. This finely created figure was carved from a single piece of marble.

== See also ==
- Poseidon of Melos
- Venus de Milo
- Aphrodite of Syracuse

== Bibliography ==
- Merker, G. S. (1970). Studies in the Hellenistic Sculpture of the island of Rhodes (PDF). Rome: Bryn Mawr College Ph.D.
