= Christ Pantocrator (Palladas) =

Painting by Ieremias Palladas

- Χριστὸς Παντοκράτωρ (Greek), Cristo Pantocratore (Italian)
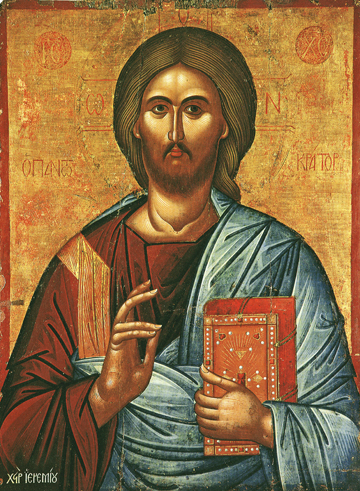
- Artist: Ieremias Palladas
- Year: 1608 - 1645
- Medium: Tempera on panel
- Movement: Late Cretan School
- Subject: Christ Pantocrator
- Dimensions: 107 cm × 79 cm (42.1 in × 31.1 in)
- Location: Panagia tou Kastrou, Rhodes, Greece

Christ Pantocrator is a tempera painting created by Ieremias Palladas. Ieremias was associated with Saint Catherine's sacred monastery in Egypt also known as Mount Sinai. He was a Sinaitic monk, painter, and teacher. His nephew Gerasimos Palladas became the Patriarch of Alexandria. There was a dependency of Saint Catherine's Monastery which was in Mount Sinai, Egypt on the island of Crete which was called Saint Catherine's Monastery of Heraklion. The site in Egypt was believed by Christians to be the site where Moses saw the burning bush. The Patriarch of Jerusalem Nectarius wrote about the painter in his archives because Ieremias was one of the most influential figures of his time.

Jesus Christ is the central figure of Christianity, the world's largest religion. He was a first-century Jewish preacher and religious leader. Since the inception of the religion, he has been depicted in countless paintings. Christ Pantocrator is a specific depiction of the almighty. The word is derived from the Greek words παντός (pantos) meaning all and κράτος (kratos), meaning power and dominion. The word Pantocrator defines Christ as the ruler and judge of heaven and earth. The earliest known depiction of Christ as Christ Pantocrator (Sinai) was painted during the 6th century. The work of art is part of the collection of Saint Catherine's Monastery. Church domes became a common site of Pantocrator images in the Greek and Italian world. The specific version painted by Ieremias was a common theme used by painters during the Proto-Renaissance. Luca di Tommè and Andreas Pavias both created similar versions. Palladas' work is more in line with the style adapted by Pavias. Later artists such as El Greco and Titian replaced the bible with a globe the painting theme became known as Salvator Mundi. The current painting was removed from the Church of Saint Nicholas, Ialysos (Trianta), Rhodes, Greece, and is now on display at Panagia tou Kastrou.

== Description ==
The work of art was completed between 1608 and 1645. It follows the traditional Greek Italian Byzantine Proto-Renaissance style. The height of the work is 117.5 cm (46.3 in.) and the width is 78.5 cm (30.9 in.). The painting was completed using gold leaf, wood panel, and egg tempera paint. The icon follows the traditional maniera greca which is characterized by a gilded background, flattened space, and striations to suggest folds of fabric. The artwork is well-preserved and is roughly four hundred years old. Precious gems and jewels adorn the Bible. Christ holds the Holy Bible in his left hand and the Pantocrator blesses the world with the sign of benediction with his right hand. His hair features clearly established lines, contours, and grooves and creates spatial depth. Ieremias paints clear curvature and shadows on the subject's face. Christ's attire features luxuriant patterns and brilliant colors representative of his celestial majestic stature. The template used by Ieremias was common for painters of the Cretan school. Each specific iconic variation featured distinguishable differences but it was a common theme from 1400 until today. The painter also signed his work which was common after the 1400s for Greek and Italian painters.

== Gallery ==
=== Proto Renaissance ===
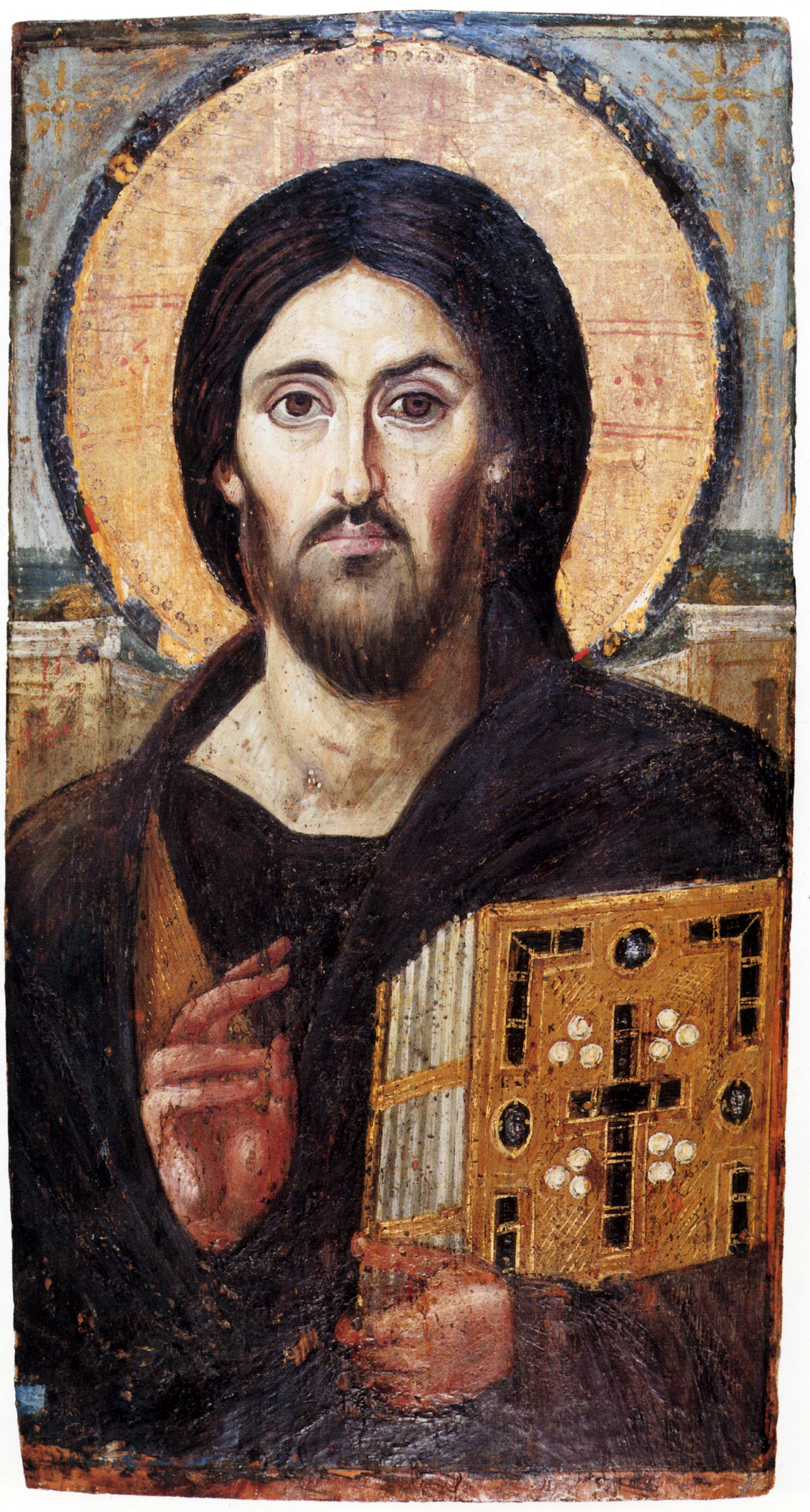
Christ Pantocrator (Sinai)

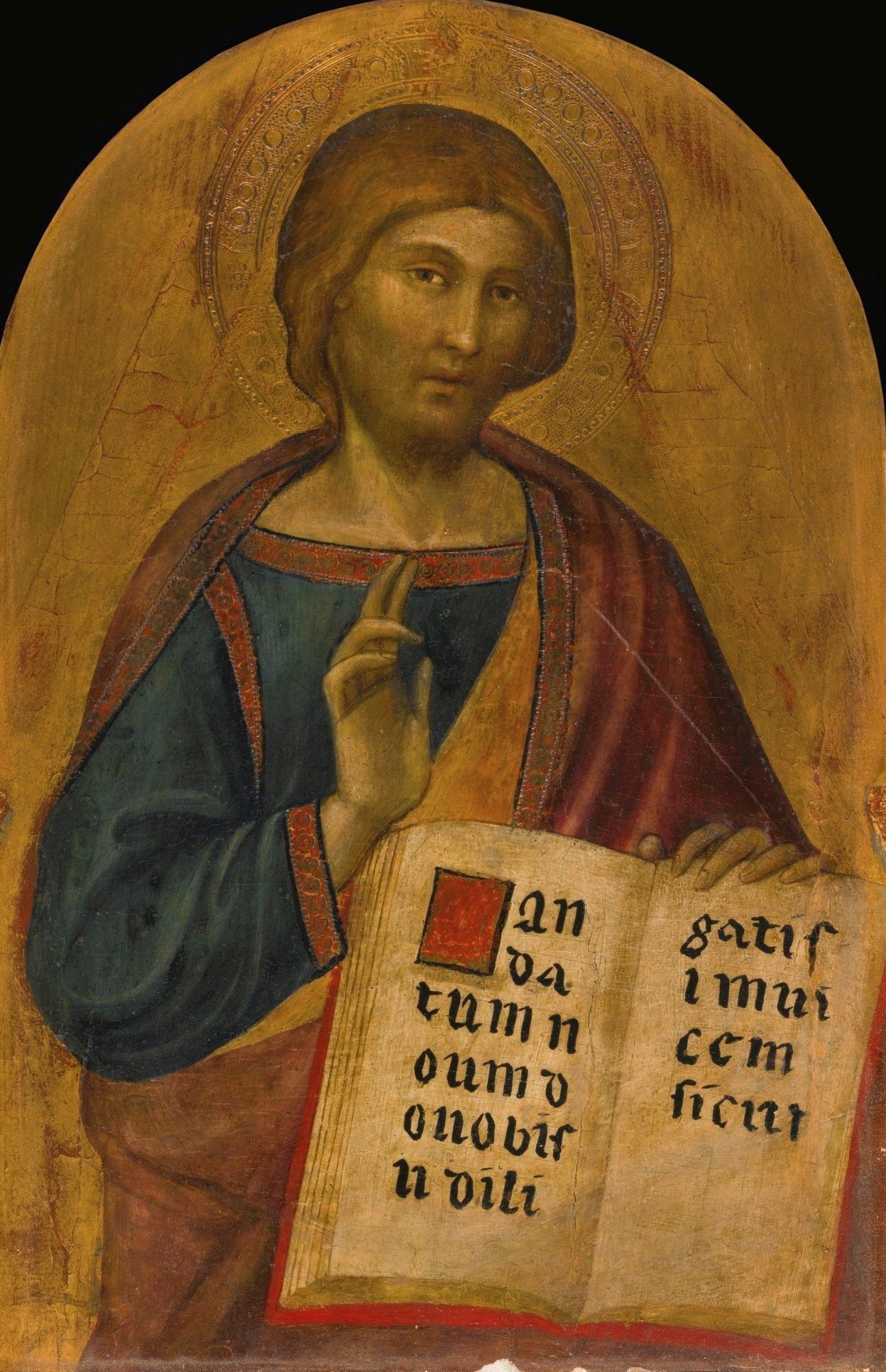
Christ Pantocrator Luca di Tommè

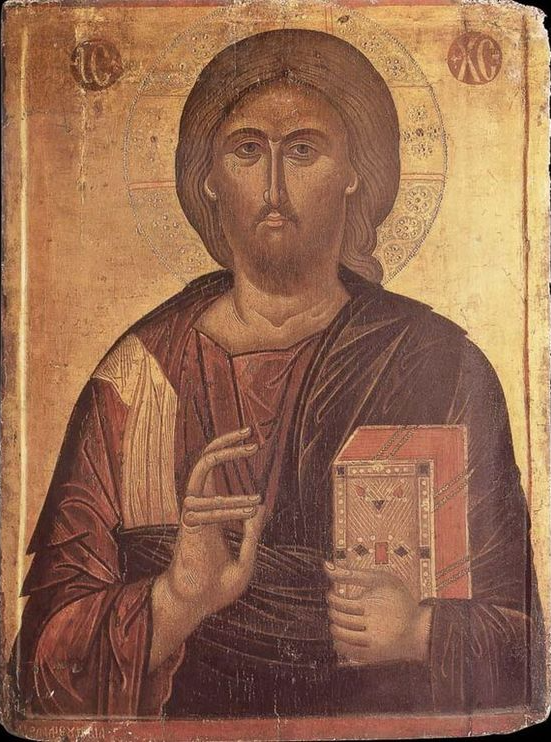
Christ Pantocrator (Pavias)

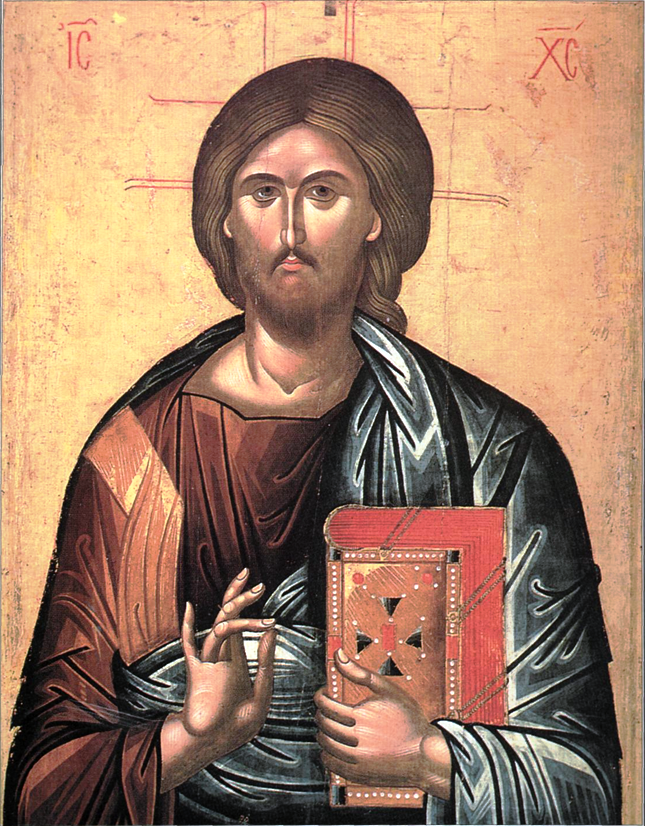
Christ Pantocrator (Euphrosynos)

=== Renaissance ===
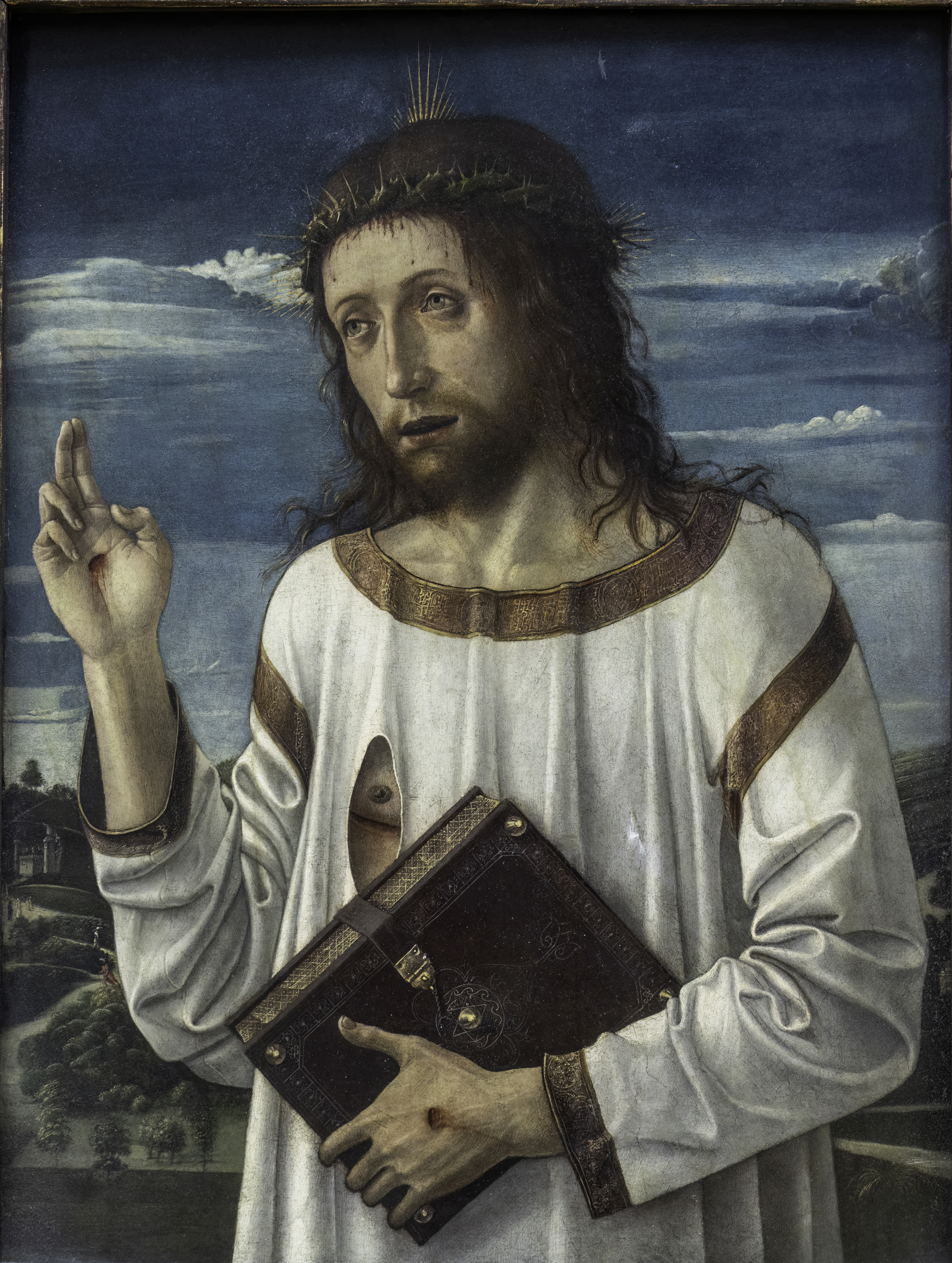
Blessing Christ Giovanni Bellini

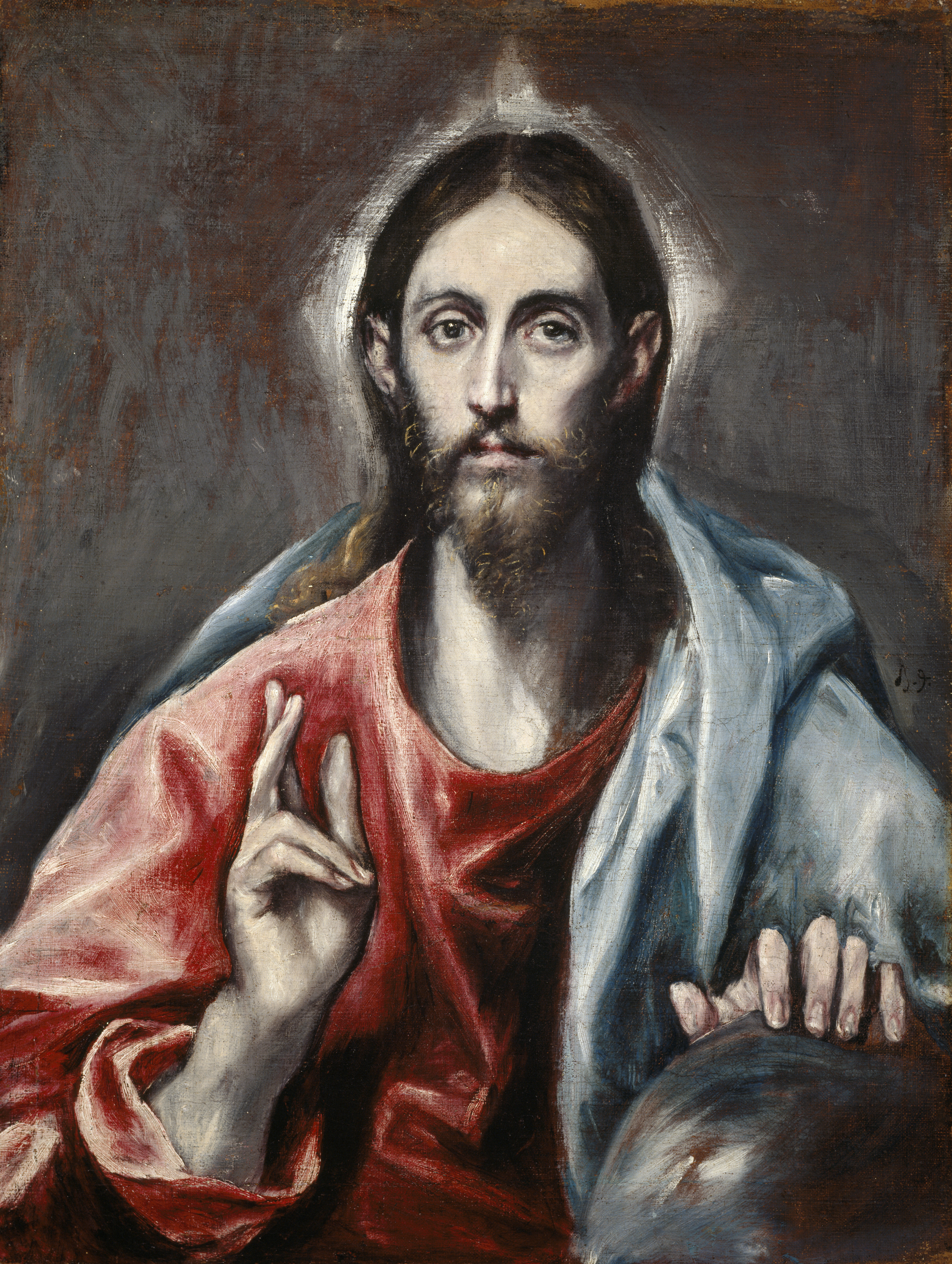
Salvator Mundi El Greco

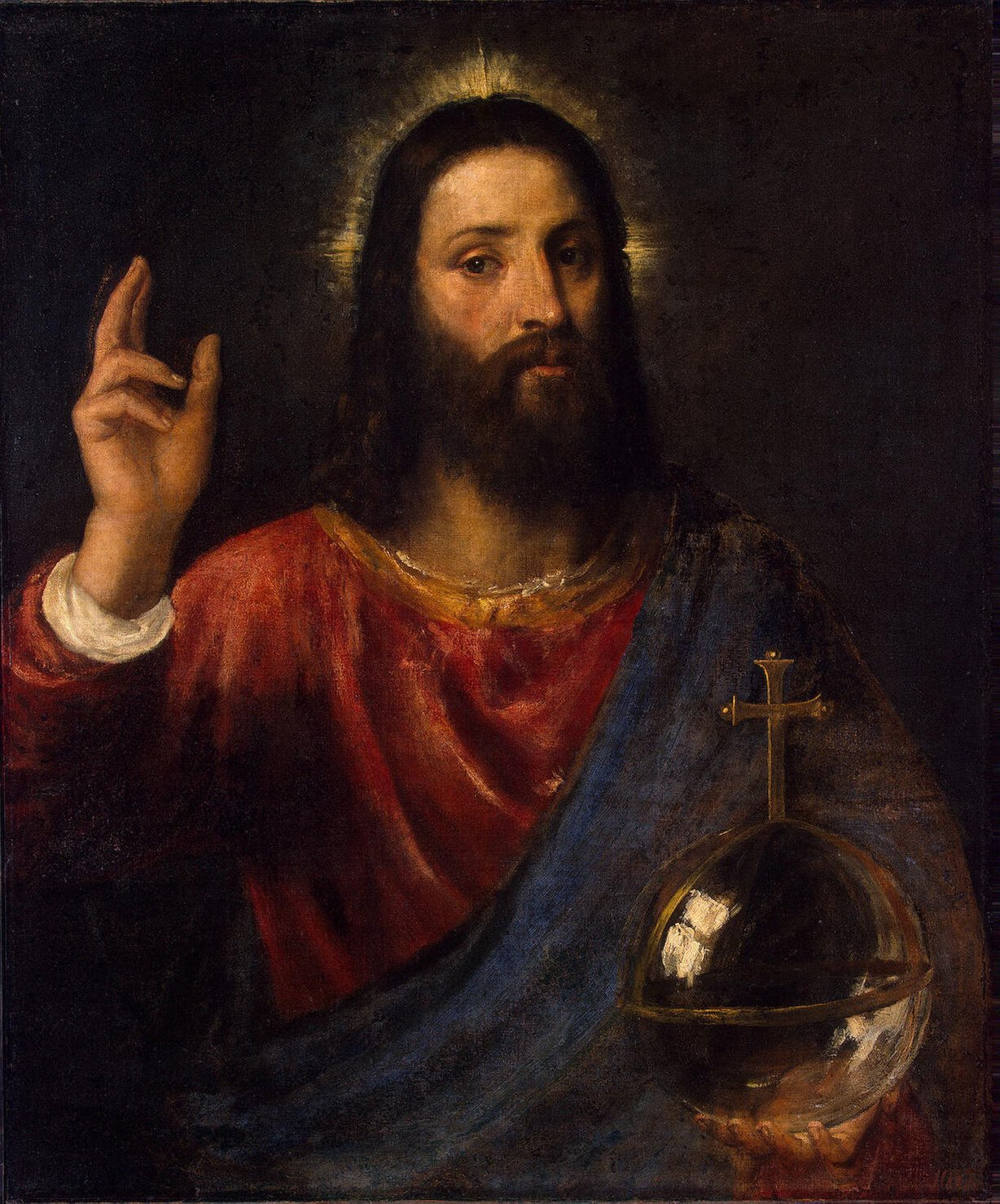
Salvator Mundi Titian

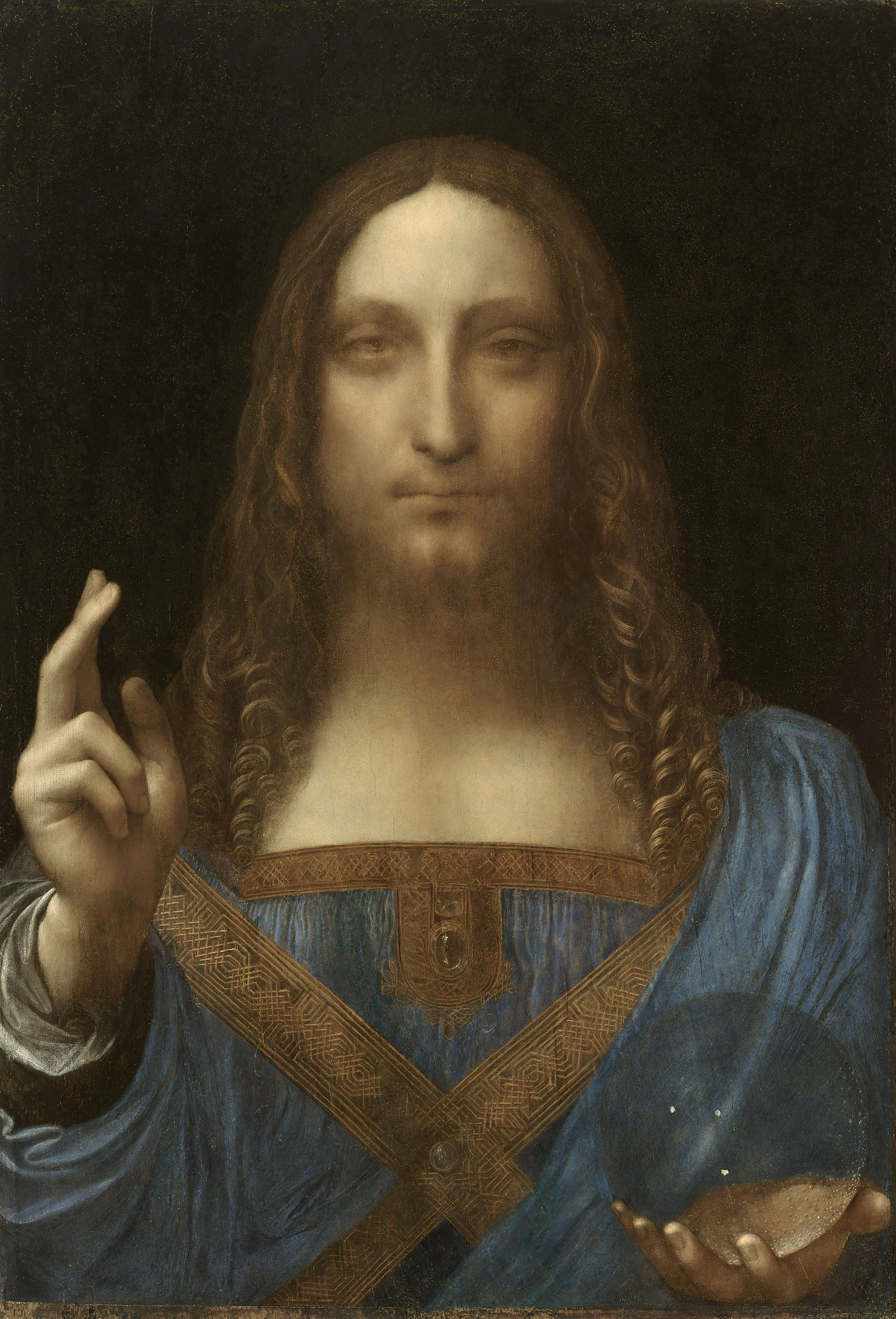
Salvator Mundi Leonardo da Vinci

== Bibliography ==
- Hatzidakis, Manolis; Drakopoulou, Evgenia (1997). Έλληνες Ζωγράφοι μετά την Άλωση (1450-1830). Τόμος 2: Καβαλλάρος - Ψαθόπουλος [Greek Painters after the Fall of Constantinople (1450-1830). Volume 2: Kavallaros - Psathopoulos]. Athens: Center for Modern Greek Studies, National Research Foundation. hdl:10442/14088. ISBN 960-7916-00-X.
- Kleiner, Fred S. (2009). Gardner's Art through the Ages: A Concise Global History, Second Edition. Boston, MA: Wadsworth Cengage Learning. ISBN 978-0495503460.
- Collins, Kristen M. (2006). Holy Image, Hallowed Ground: Icons from Sinai. Los Angeles: California: J. Paul Getty Museum. ISBN 9780892368563.
- Karagiannidou, Electra (2006). Η Συντήρηση της Φορητής Εικόνας "Χριστός Μέγας Αρχιερέας" από τον Ιερό ναό Ευαγγελισμού της Θεοτόκου, στην Αλεξάνδρεια της Αιγύπτου [The Maintenance of the Portable Icon "Christ the Great High Priest" from the Holy Church of the Annunciation of the Theotokos, in Alexandria, Egypt]. Icons: Approaches to Research, Conservation and Ethical Issues. Athens, Greece: Benaki Museum. Archived from the original on June 21, 2023.
- Vermes, Geza (1981). Jesus the Jew: A Historian's Reading of the Gospels. Philadelphia: First Fortress. ISBN 978-0-8006-1443-0. Archived from the original on 8 October 2020.
- Borboudakis, Manolis (2004). Icons of Cretan Αrt from Chandakas to Moscow and St. Petersburg. Athens, Greece: Vikelaia Municipal Library. ISBN 9789607970152.
- Evans, Helen C. (2004). Saint Catherine's Monastery, Sinai, Egypt A Photographic Essay. New York, NY: Metropolitan Museum of Art in collaboration with Saint Catherine's Monastery, Sinai. ISBN 9781588391094.
