= Medieval City of Rhodes =

UNESCO World Heritage Site
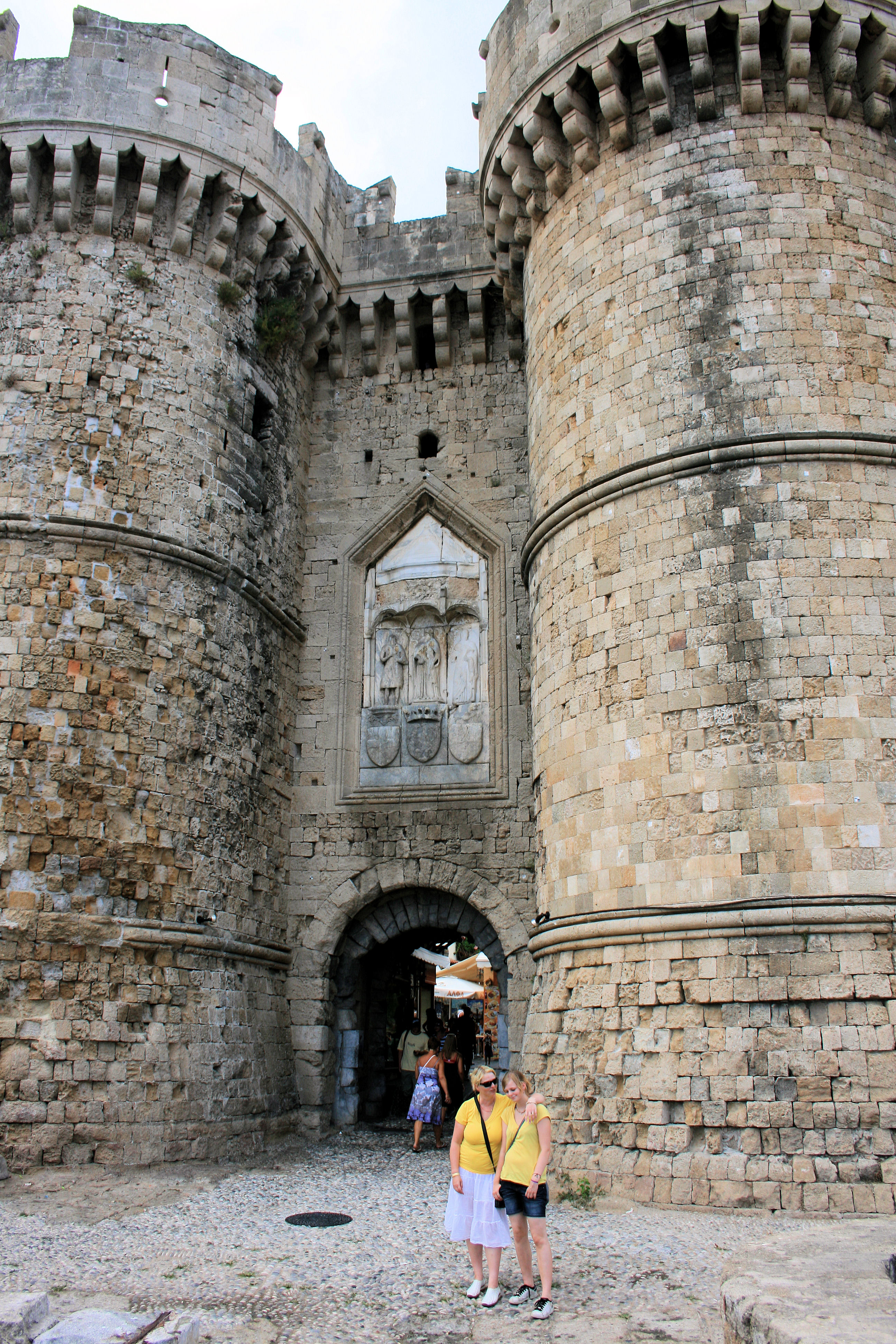
- Interactive map of Medieval City of Rhodes
- Location: Greece
- Criteria: Cultural: ii, iv, v
- Reference: 493
- Inscription: 1988 (12th Session)
- Area: 65.85 ha (162.7 acres)
- Coordinates: 36°26′N 28°13′E

The Medieval City of Rhodes was constructed around 1309 to 1523 and is part of the modern capital city of Rhodes on the Island of Rhodes in Greece. The site was added to the UNESCO World Heritage list in 1988.

The Medieval city consists of the high town to the north and the lower town south-southwest. The high town was entirely built by the Hospitaller Rhodes. The Medieval city is located within a 4 km long wall.

== Gallery ==
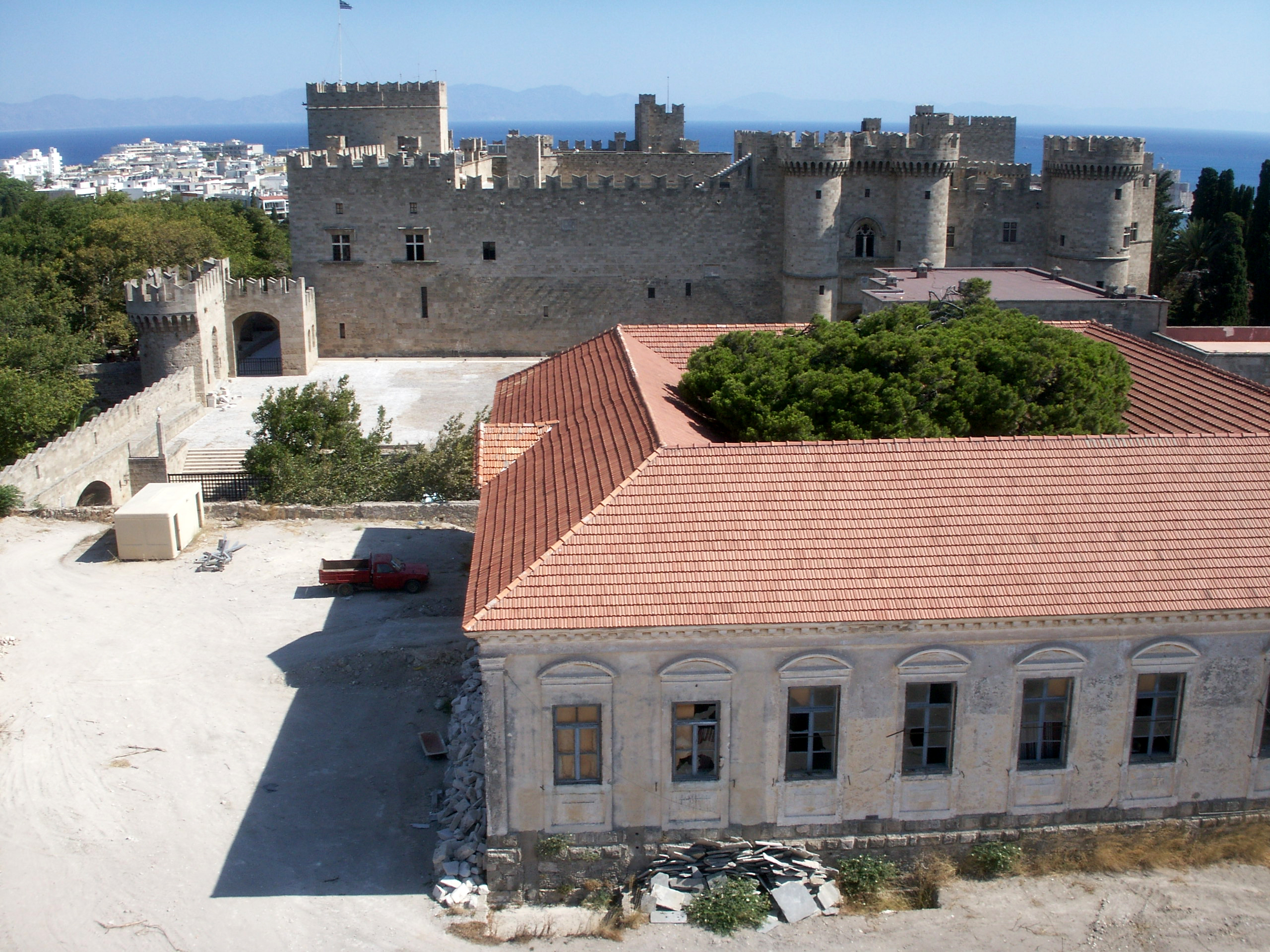
Palace of the Grand Master of the Knights of Rhodes

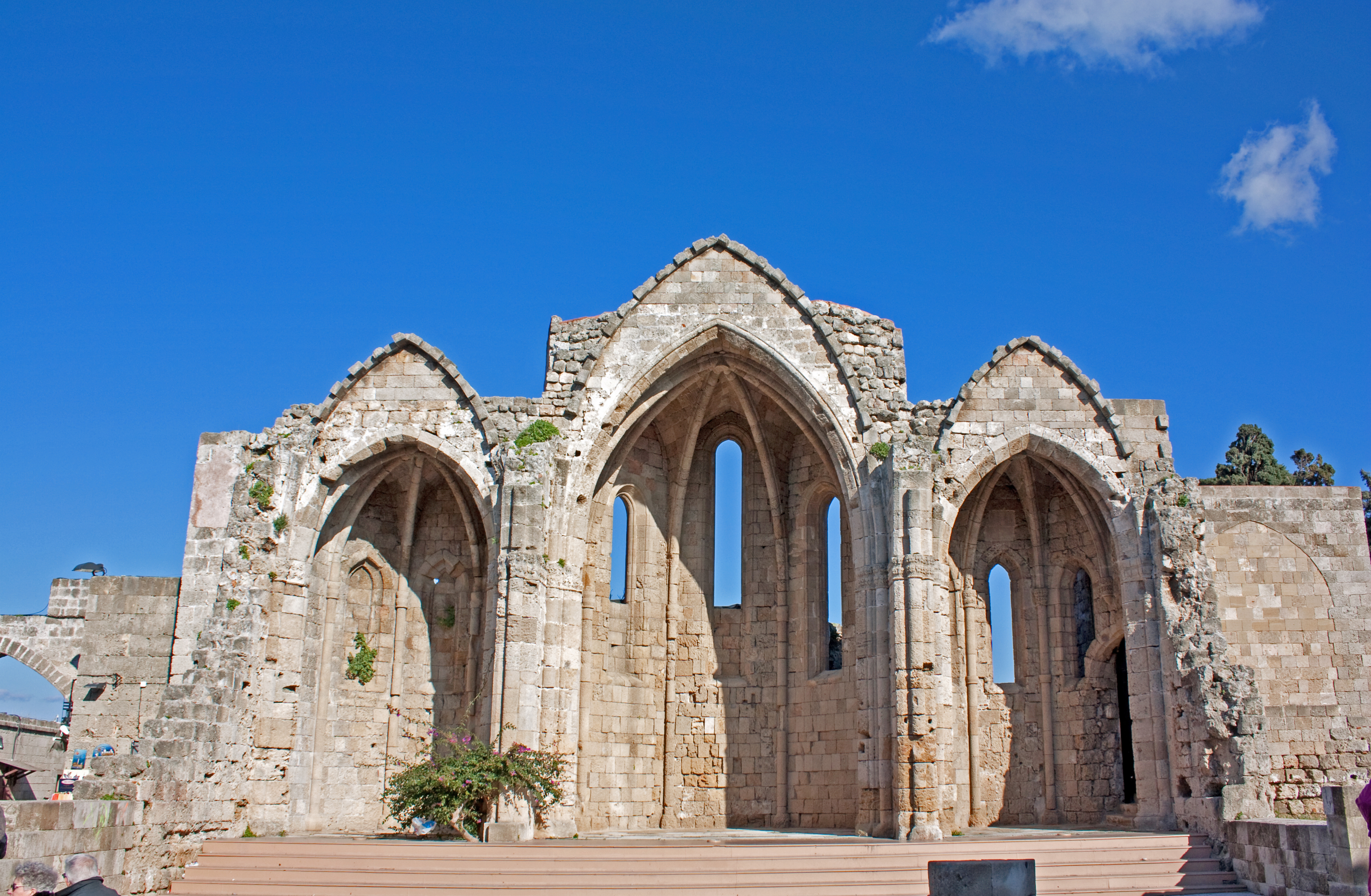
Medieval church of the Virgin

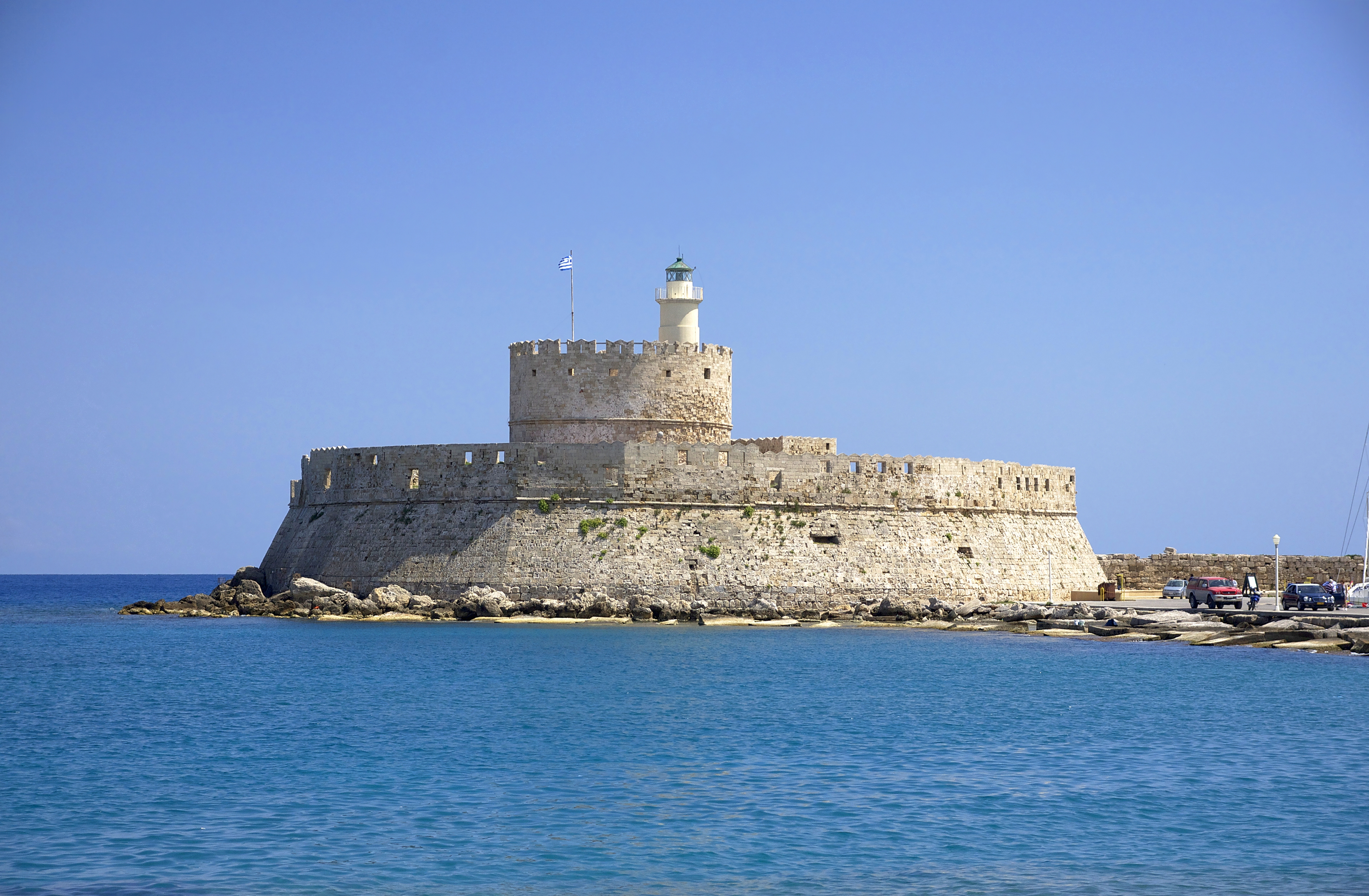
Fort Saint Nicolas

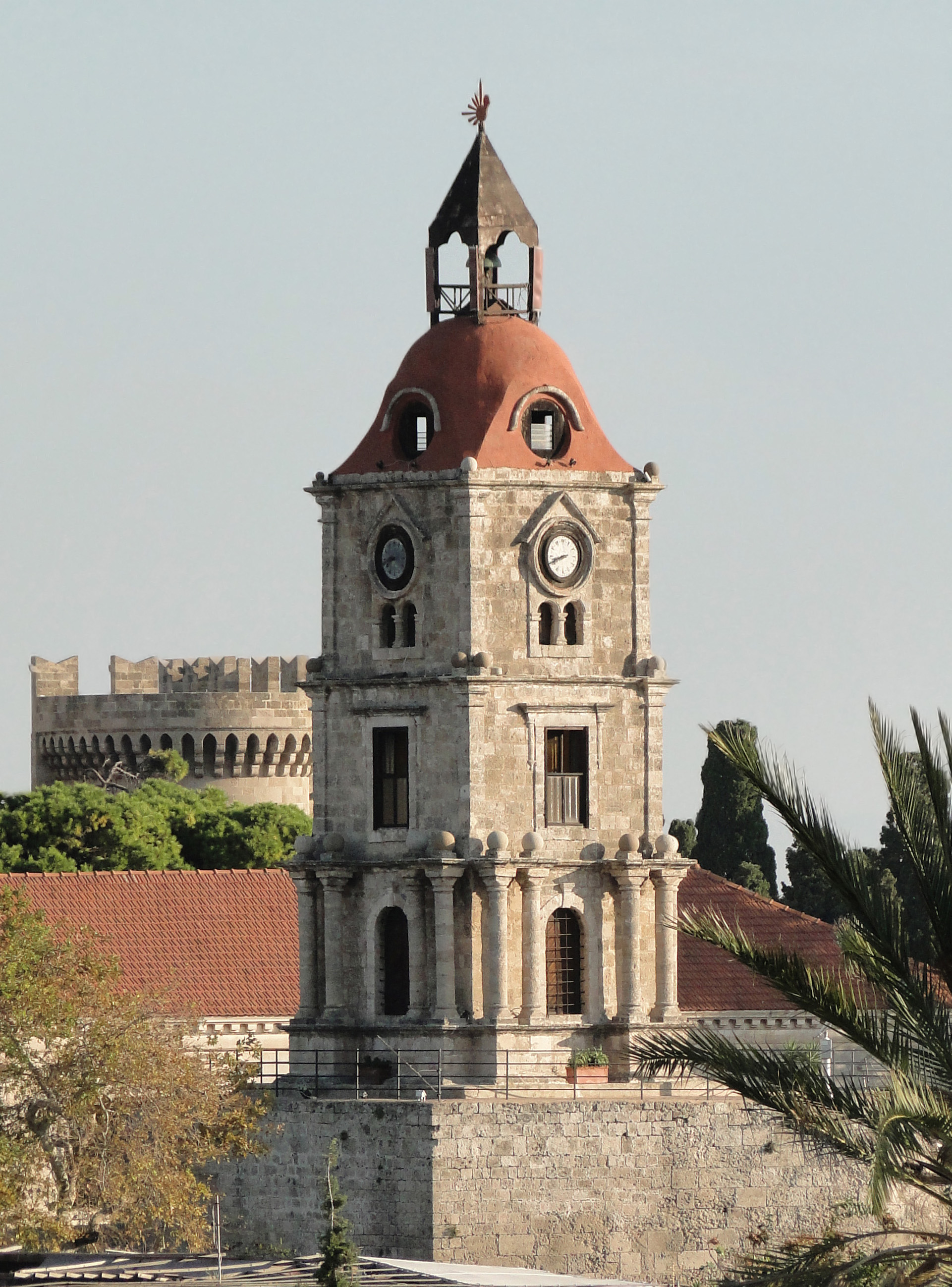
clocktower

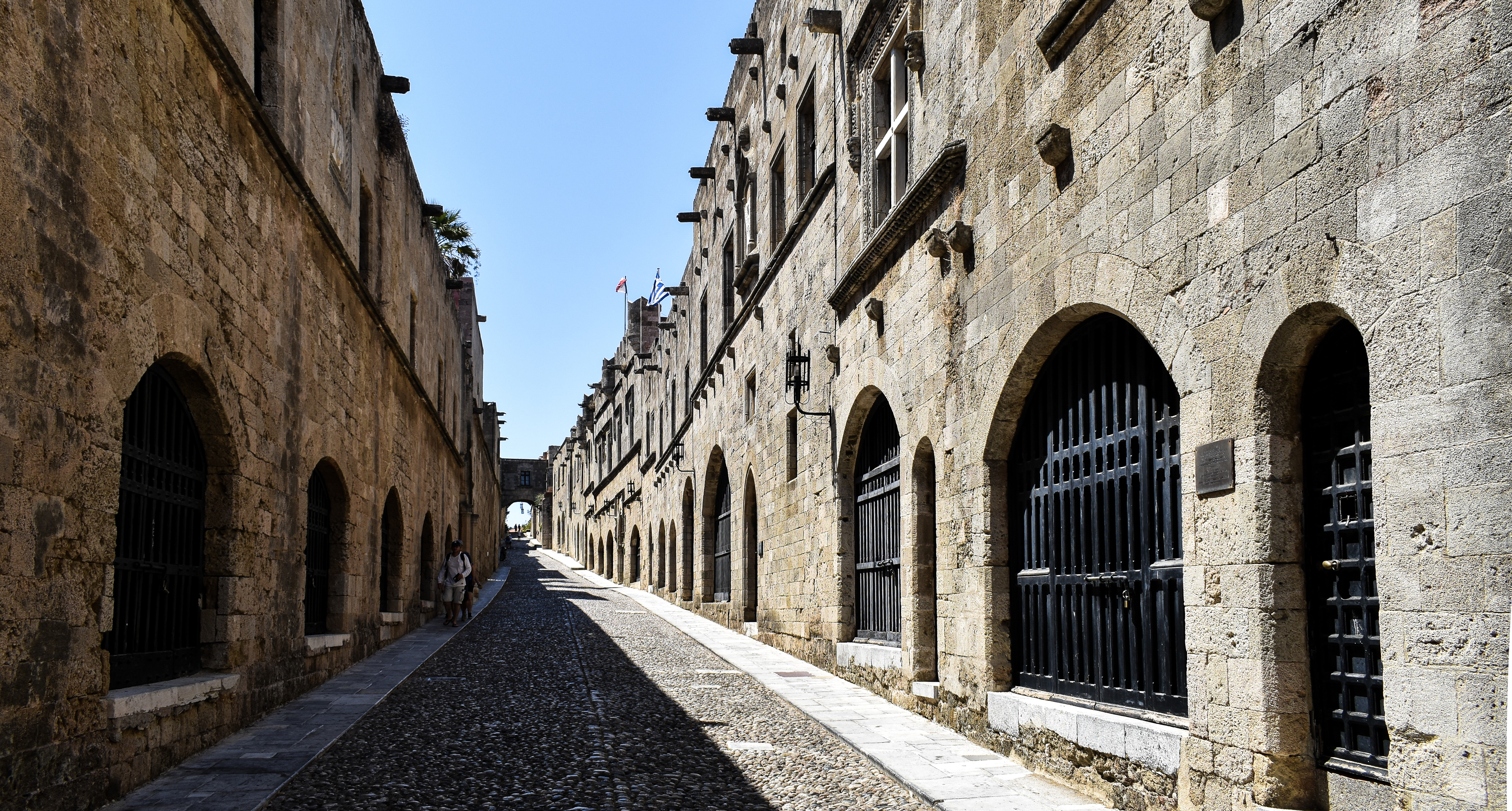
Street of the Knights

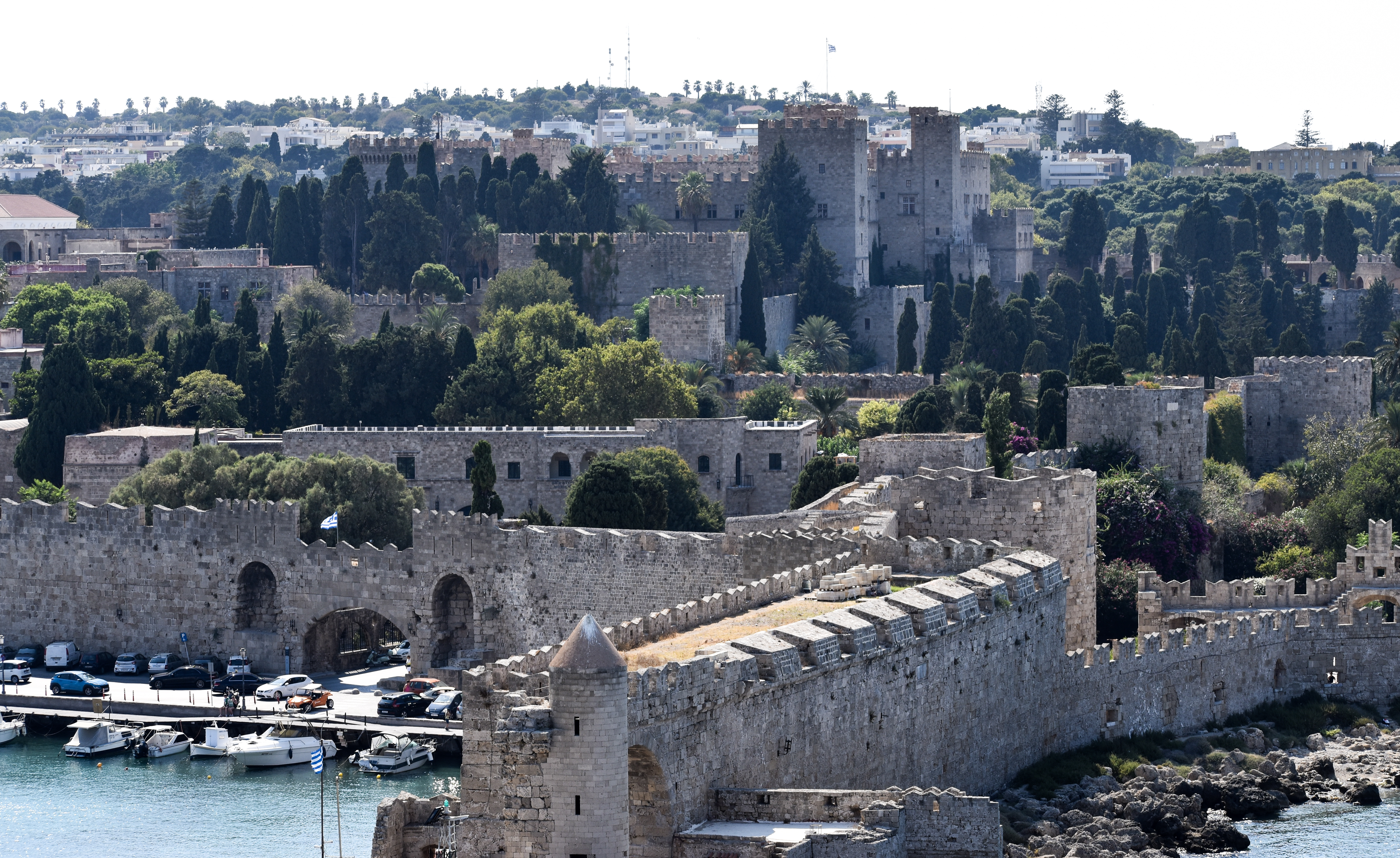
Fortifications from the east

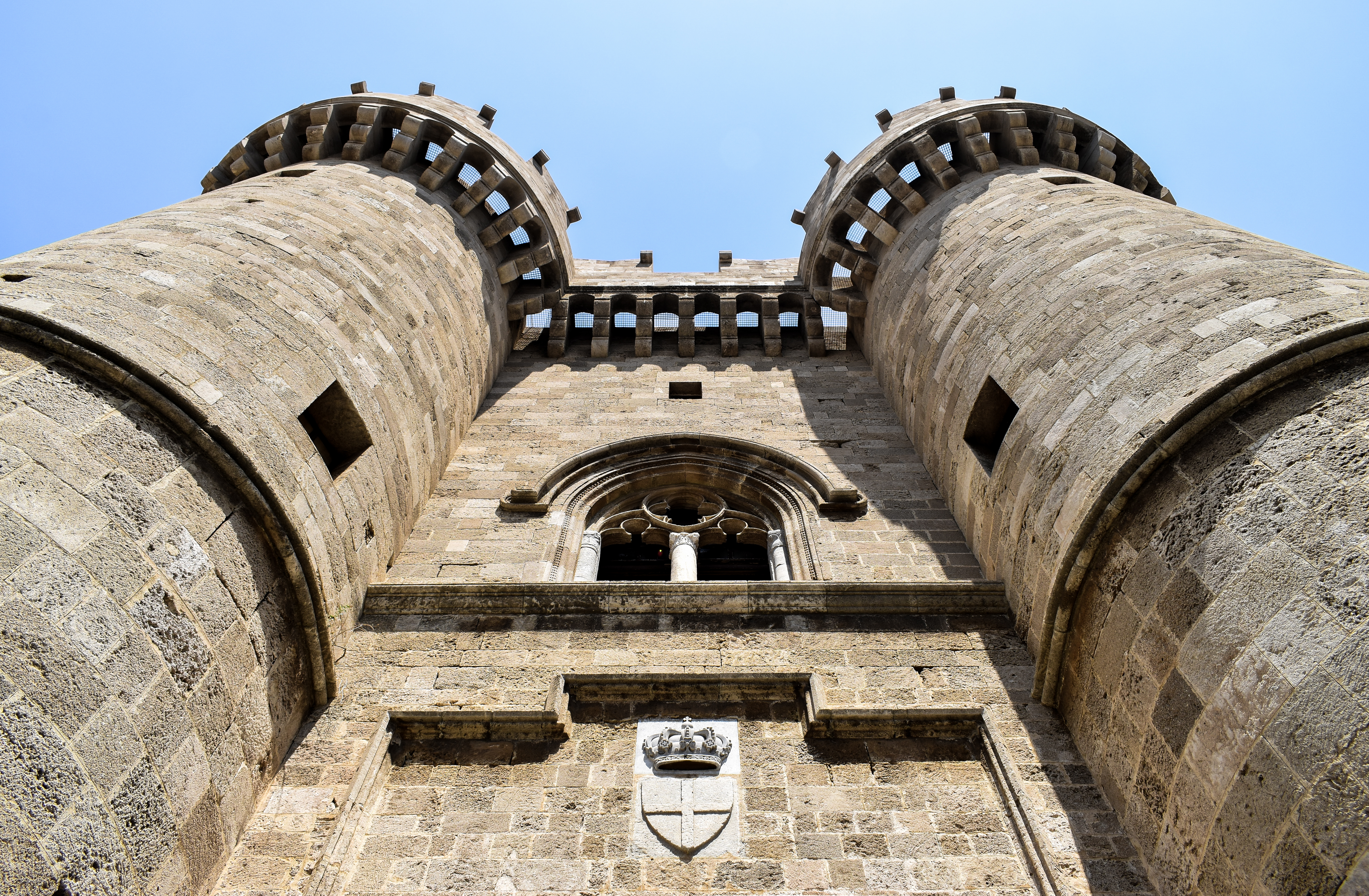
Entrance to the Palace of the Grand Master of the Knights of Rhodes

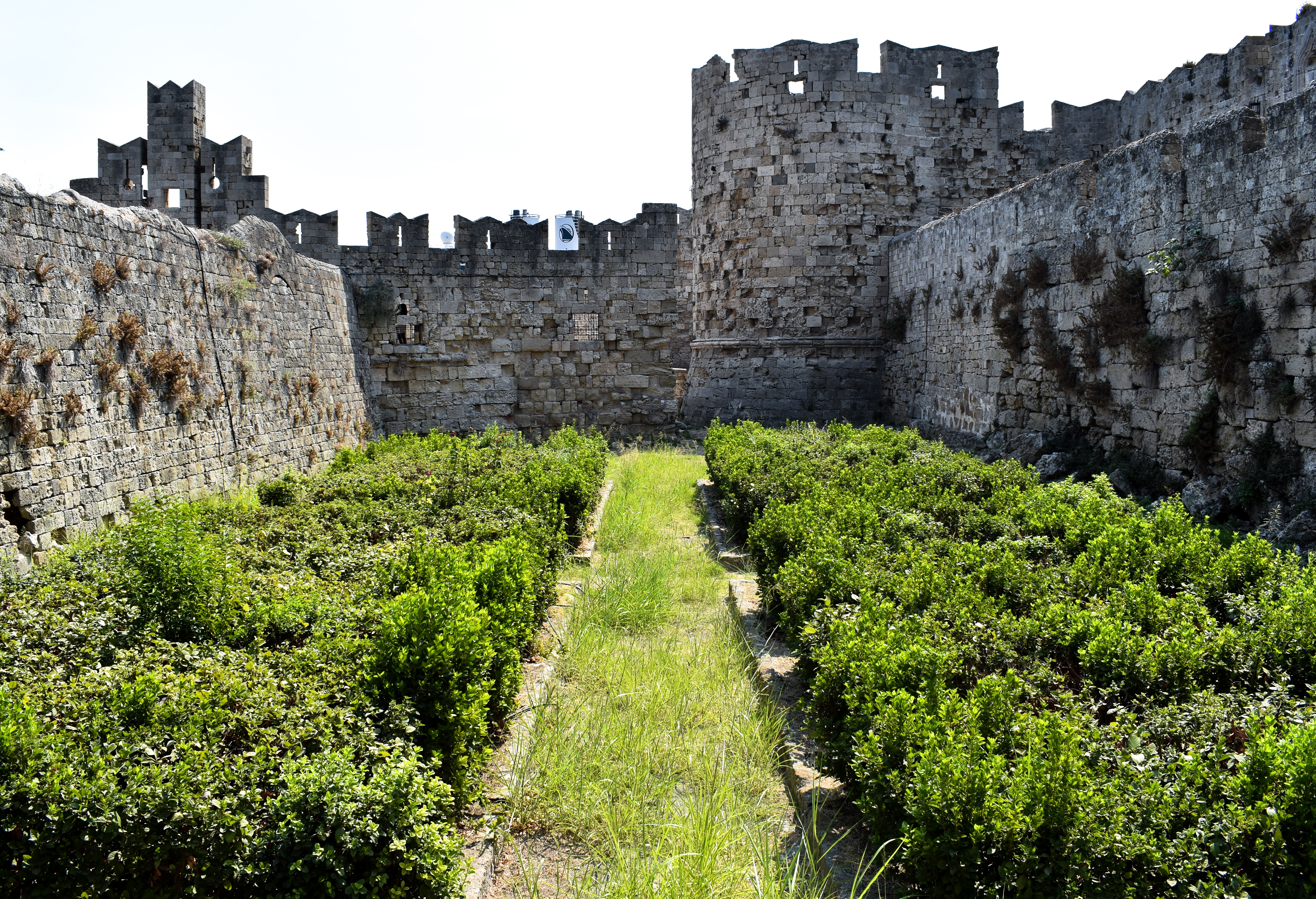
Platia Simis
