= Stegna, Rhodes =

Stegna Στεγνά
- Settlement
- Location within Greece
- Coordinates: 36°12′N 28°08′E
- Country: Greece
- Administrative region: South Aegean
- Regional unit: Rhodes
- Municipality: Rhodes
- Municipal unit: Archangelos
- Community: Archangelos
- Elevation: 4 m (13 ft)

Population (2021)
  - Total: 275
- Time zone: UTC+2 (EET)
  - Summer (DST): UTC+3 (EEST)

Stegna (Greek: Στεγνά) is a small village and part of the former municipality of Archangelos on the island of Rhodes, in the Dodecanese, Greece. Since the 2011 local government reform it is part of the municipality of Rhodes.

== Location and population ==
Stegna is located about 30 kilometers south of the town of Rhodes on the island's east coast close to the sea. The nearest town of Archangelos, Rhodes town is 3 kilometers away.

Stegna has a picturesque bay and is also a small holiday resort with tavernas, restaurants, bars and apartments close to the beach. Stegna is only half an hour drive from Rhodes International Airport, and 20 minutes drive from Lindos.

The population according to the 2021 census was 275. Most residents of Stegna are inhabitants of the nearby town Archangelos, Rhodes.

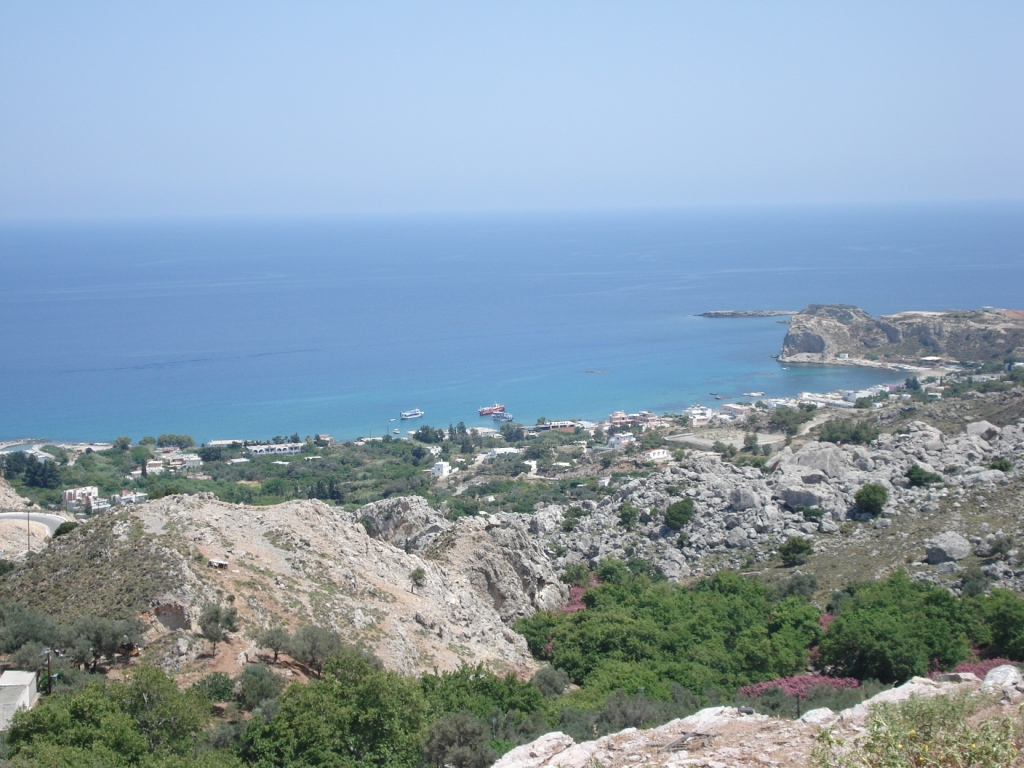
Stegna - Panoramic view

Stegna - View from the street

Stegna - View of the beach

Stegna - View of the bay

Stegna - View of the mountains

== History ==
Stegna was a fishing village and a cultivation place, mostly with orange and olive groves. Archangelos and Stegna have also been well known since ancient Greek times for their potters.

== Economy ==
Major economic resources include tourism, fishing and agriculture (main agricultural products are olive oil and citrus fruits).

== Tourist attractions ==
Nearby:

- castle of Saint George ruins
- cave of Koumellos
- church of Saint Michael Archangel

== See also ==
- Tsampika
- Haraki
