= Archangelos, Rhodes =

Archangelos Αρχάγγελος
- Municipal unit
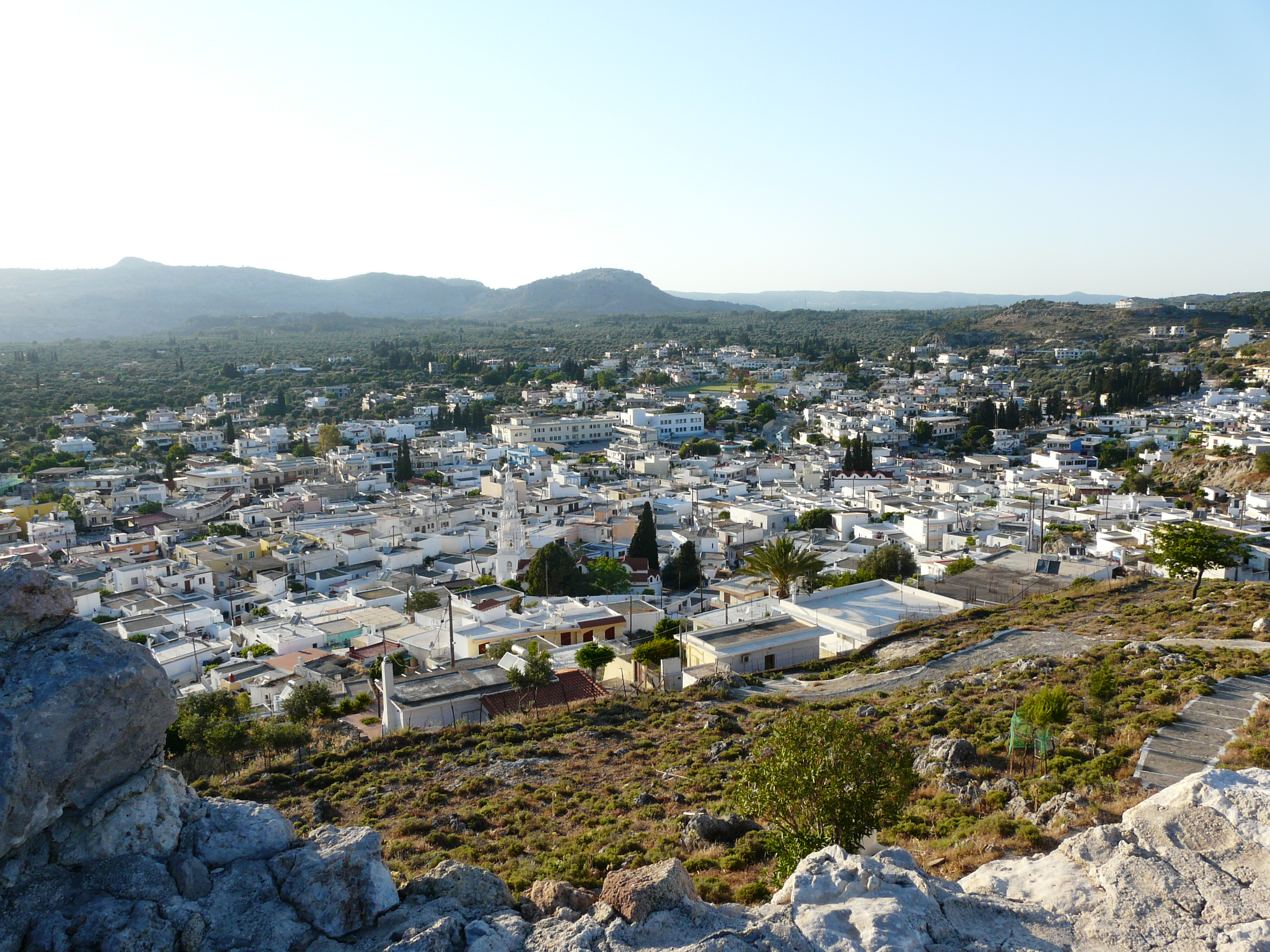

- Location within the Dodecanese

- Location within Greece
- Coordinates: 36°13′N 28°07′E
- Country: Greece
- Administrative region: South Aegean
- Regional unit: Rhodes
- Municipality: Rhodes

Area
  - Municipal unit: 115.4 km^{2} (44.6 sq mi)
- Elevation: 154 m (505 ft)

Population (2021)
  - Municipal unit: 7,786
  - Municipal unit density: 67.47/km^{2} (174.7/sq mi)
  - Community: 5,695
- Time zone: UTC+2 (EET)
  - Summer (DST): UTC+3 (EEST)

Archangelos (Greek: Αρχάγγελος) is a town and a former municipality on the island of Rhodes, in the Dodecanese, Greece. Since the 2011 local government reform it is part of the municipality Rhodes, of which it is a municipal unit.

== Location and population ==
Archangelos is located about 30 kilometers south of the town of Rhodes on the island's east coast at an elevation of 160 meters. Its population according to the 2011 census was 5,384 making it the fifth largest town of the island (after the capital Rhodes, and the town of Trianta (Ialysos), Kremasti and Afantou. The town's name derives from Archangel Michael who is also considered its patron.

The municipal unit of Archangelos has a land area of 115.375 km^{2} (44.547 sq mi), and includes several other towns, the largest of which are Malónas (pop. 982) and Másari (1,004). Its total population was 7,615 at the 2011 census.

== History ==
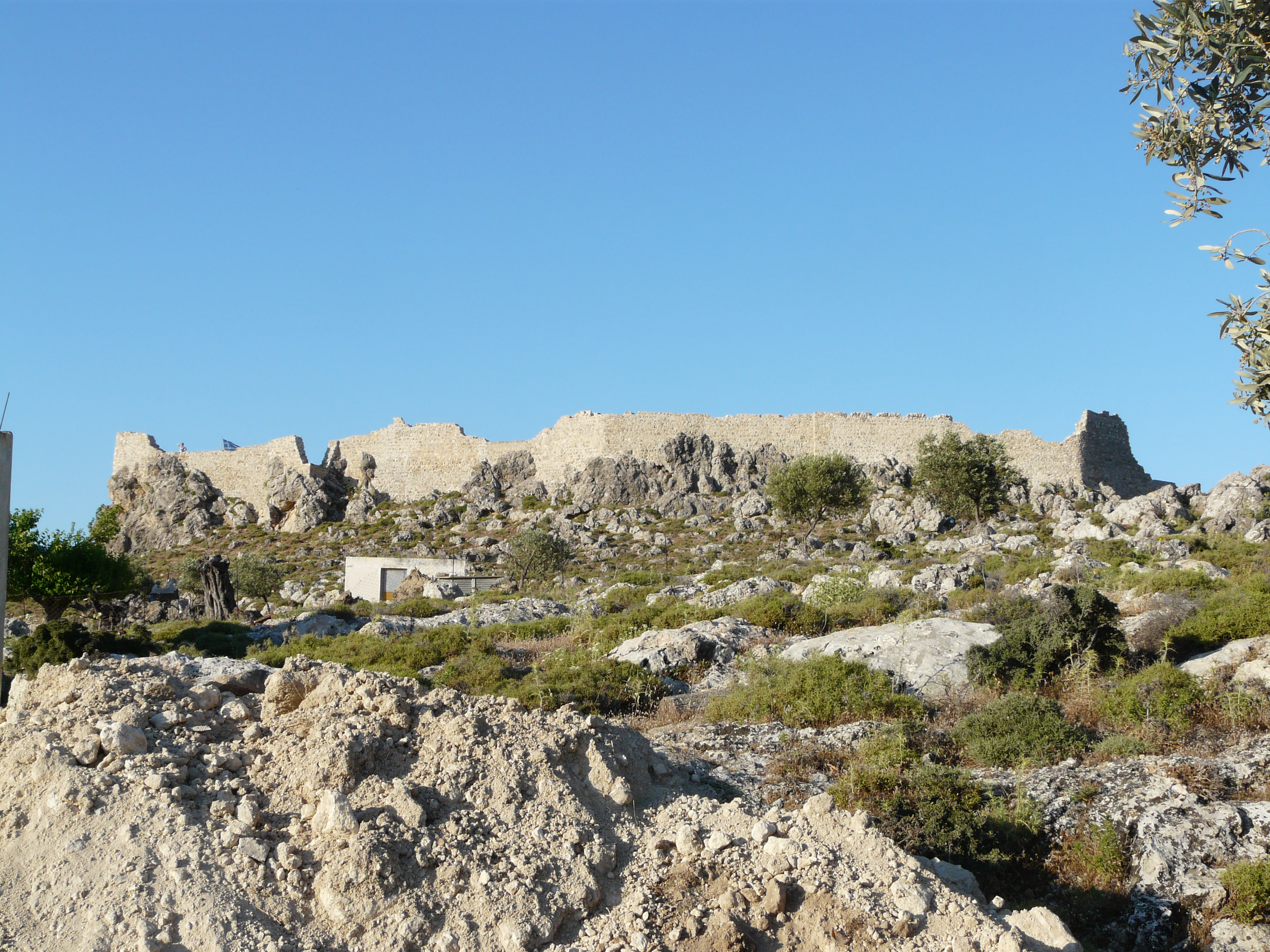
Ruins of the castle of St. John

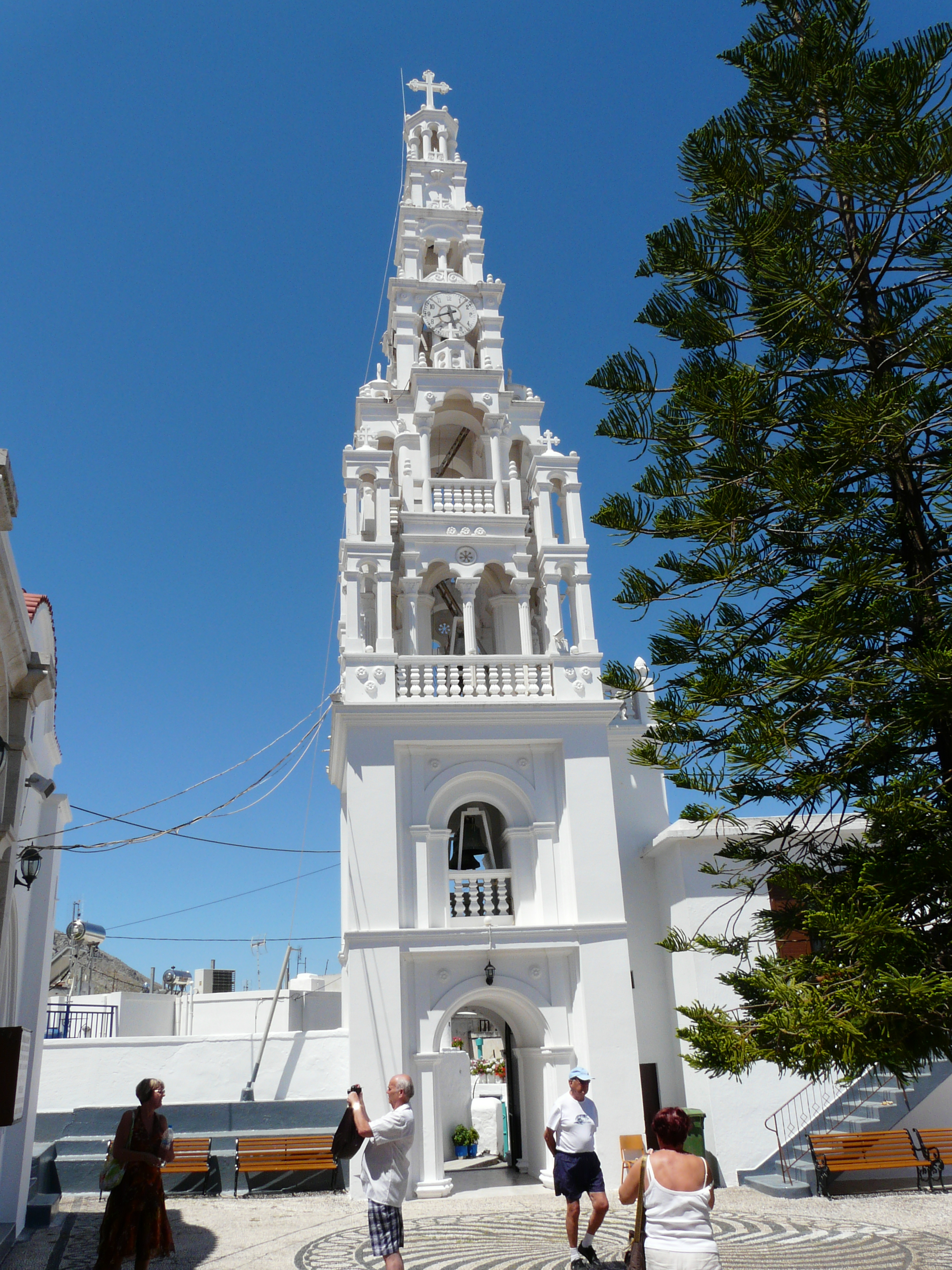
The bell tower of Archangel Michael's Orthodox church, the town's patron

Numerous small settlements existed in the broader area of Archangelos during the Hellenistic era, others on the coast and others inland. After the 7th century AD the settlements near the coast were abandoned due to the frequent invasions of pirates and their inhabitants settled on existing inland settlements or founded new ones in more secure areas. Over time the various settlements of the area were merged in one forming the town of Archangelos.

After the fall of Constantinople in 1453, the Knights Hospitaller who were occupying the island of Rhodes since 1309, built a fortress (some sort of an Acropolis) on top of one of the town's nearby hills to protect from a possible Ottoman invasion on the island. Ruins of this (castle of Saint John) fortress remain today.

== Economy ==
Major economic resources include tourism, agriculture (main agricultural products are olive oil and citrus fruits), stockbreeding and pottery. Pottery was always one of the major occupations of the people of Archangelos. It is said that the dome of Hagia Sophia was built using light bricks from Archangelos.

== Tourist attractions ==
In:

- church of the Saint Michael Archangel

Nearby:

- castle of Saint George ruins
- cave of Koumellos

== See also ==
- Haraki
- Stegna, Rhodes
