= Feraklos Castle =

Medieval fortress in Rhodes, Greece

Feraklos Castle Kάστρο Φεράκλου
- Charaki, Rhodes, Greece
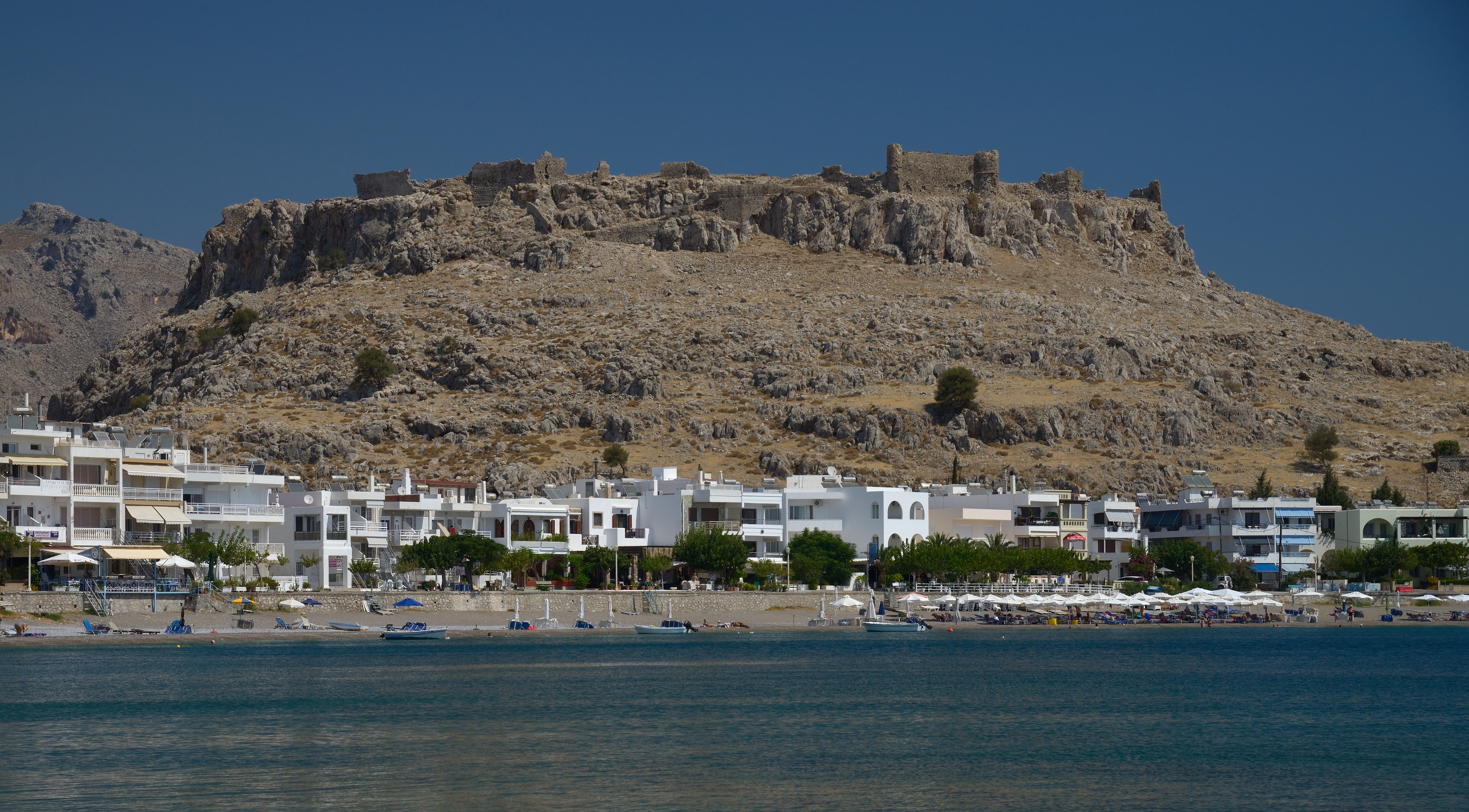
- Feraklos Castle

Site information
- Type: Fortress
- Open to the public: Yes
- Condition: ruins

Location
- Coordinates: 36.169898°N 28.098902°E

Site history
- Built: 15th century
- Built by: Byzantine Empire, Knights Hospitaller
- In use: no
- Materials: Limestone

Feraklos Castle (Greek: Kάστρο Φεράκλου), also Feraklou (Φερακλού) and Faraklenon Castle (Φαρακλενόν Kάστρο), is a ruined medieval fortress, located on an 85 m-high hill overlooking the village of Charaki on the east coast of the island of Rhodes, Greece.

== History ==
The fortress was originally built in the Byzantine era. It was captured by the Knights Hospitaller on 20 September 1306, being their first possession on the island that would become their base. By 1408 it was in ruins, and was repaired under the Grand Masters Giovanni Battista Orsini (1467–76) and Pierre d'Aubusson (1476–1503) as a stronghold to protect the area, and particularly watch over the anchorages at the Charaki and Agia Agathi beaches nearby. After 1470, the Hospitallers abandoned all other fortifications on the island except for Feraklos, nearby Lindos, and the city of Rhodes, which in turn were further strengthened. A decree of 1474 prescribed that the Feraklos Castle was the place of refuge by the inhabitants of the villages of Malona, Salia, Katagros, Zinodotou, and Kaminari when there was danger.

The fort was captured by the Ottoman Empire in 1523 after a long siege, a few months after the capture of Rhodes. The Ottomans did not use the castle and it has since been abandoned.

== Layout ==
The fortress has an irregular polygonal layout, with a wall perimeter of 680 m encompassing an area of 1,700 square meters. The northern and western portions date to Byzantine times, but the rest are additions or modifications by the Hospitallers. A single gate and two cylindrical towers survive in the southern portion of the walls, along with a cistern in the interior.

== Gallery ==
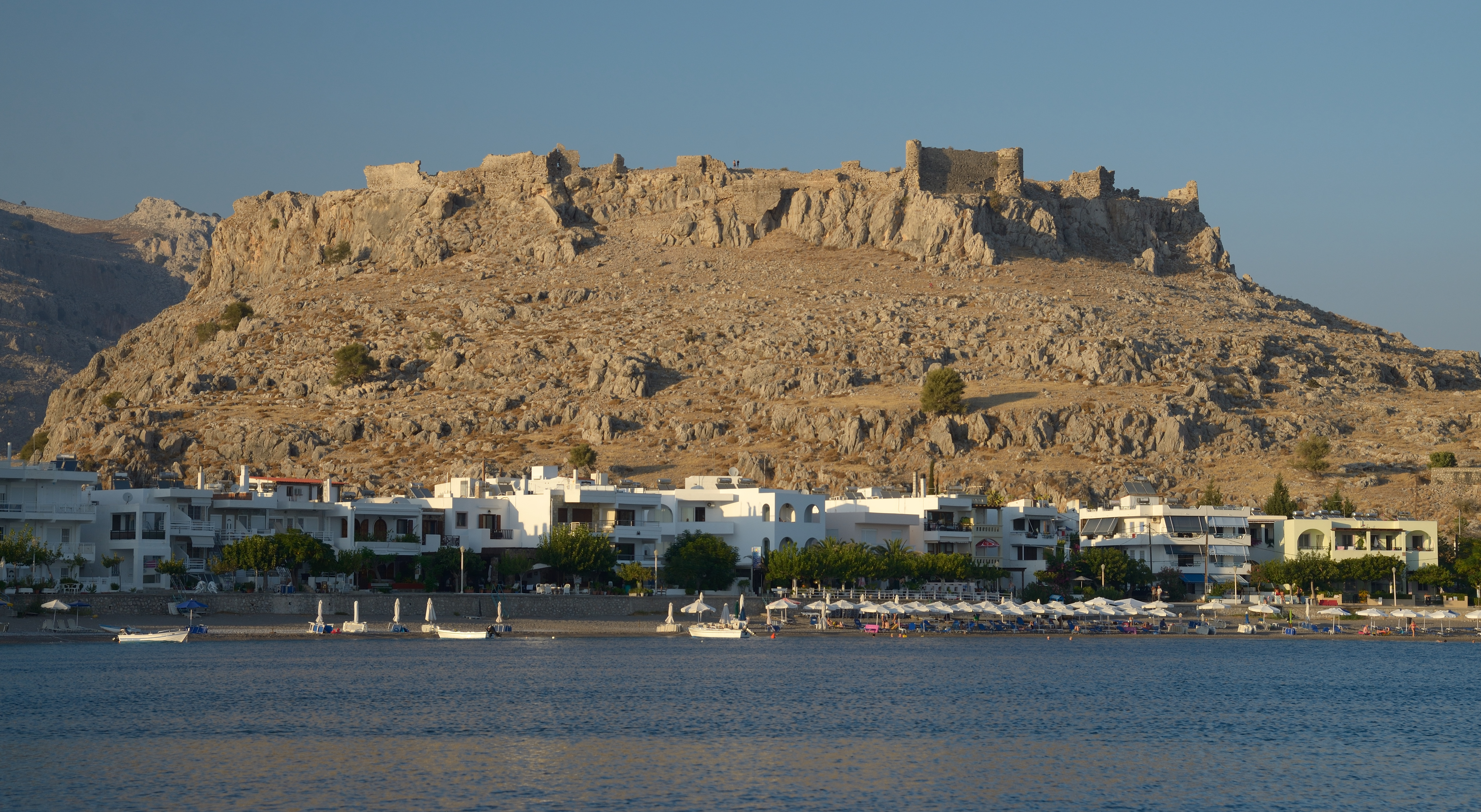
View from the south. Evening

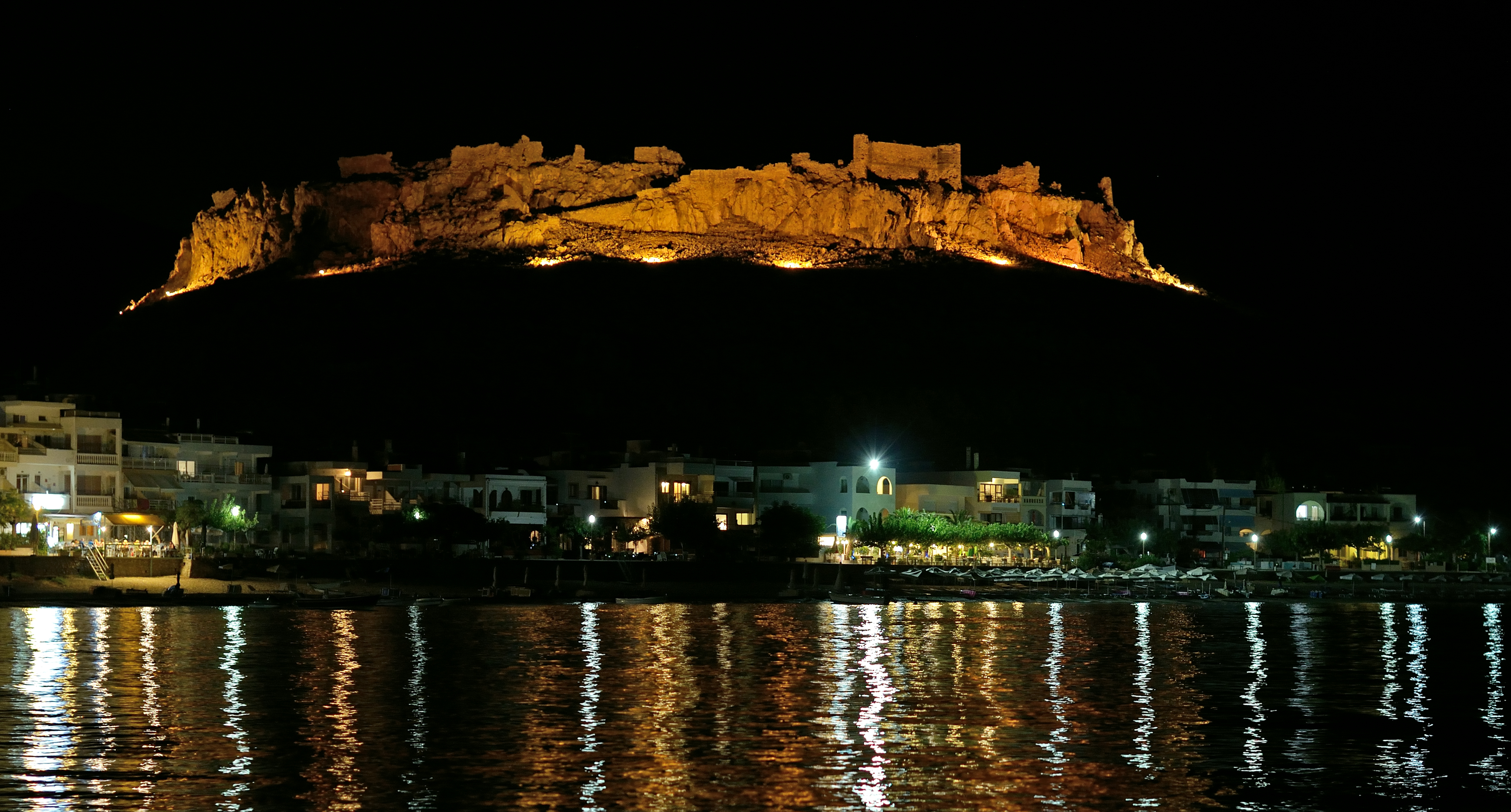
View from the south. Night

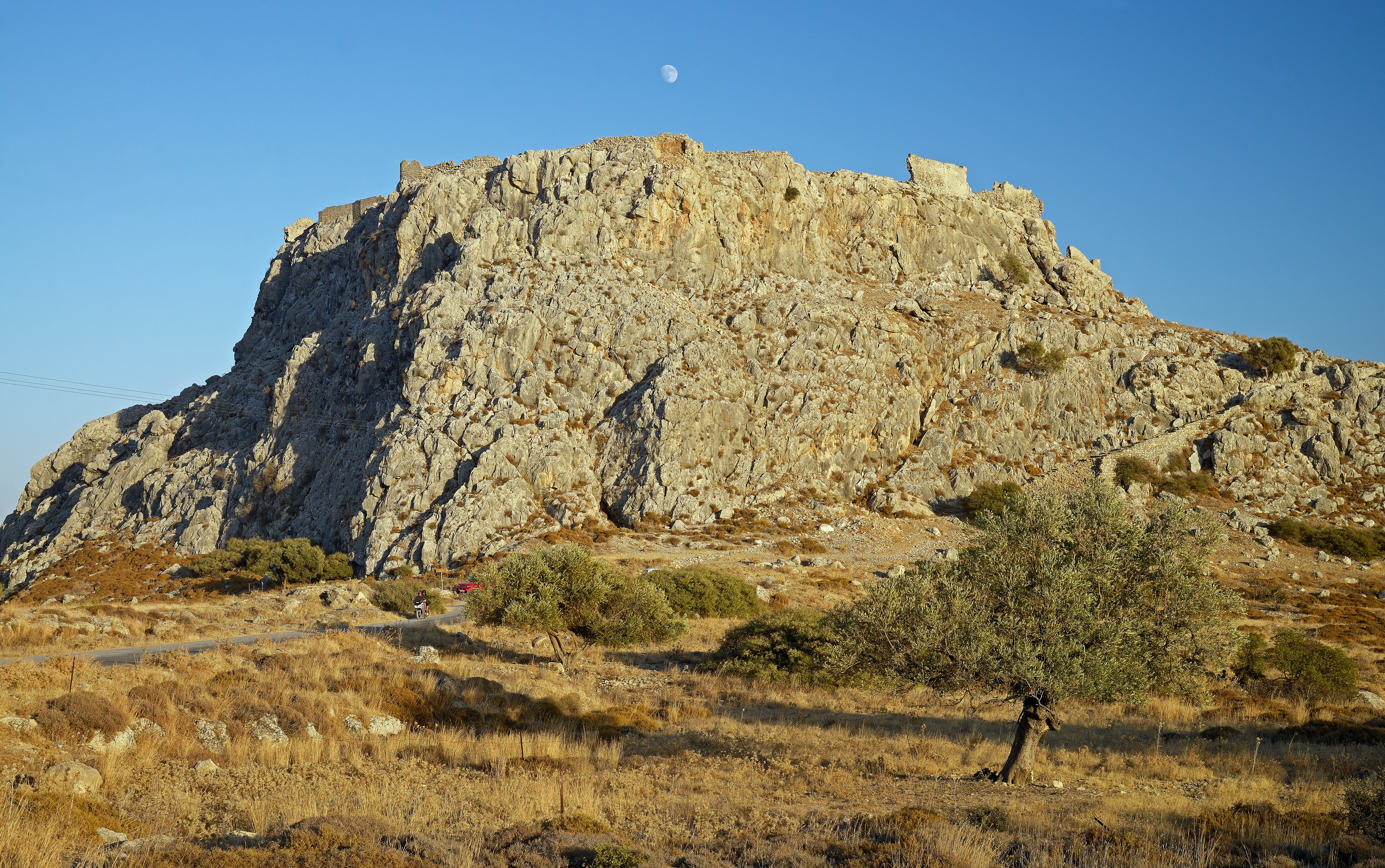
View from the west. Evening

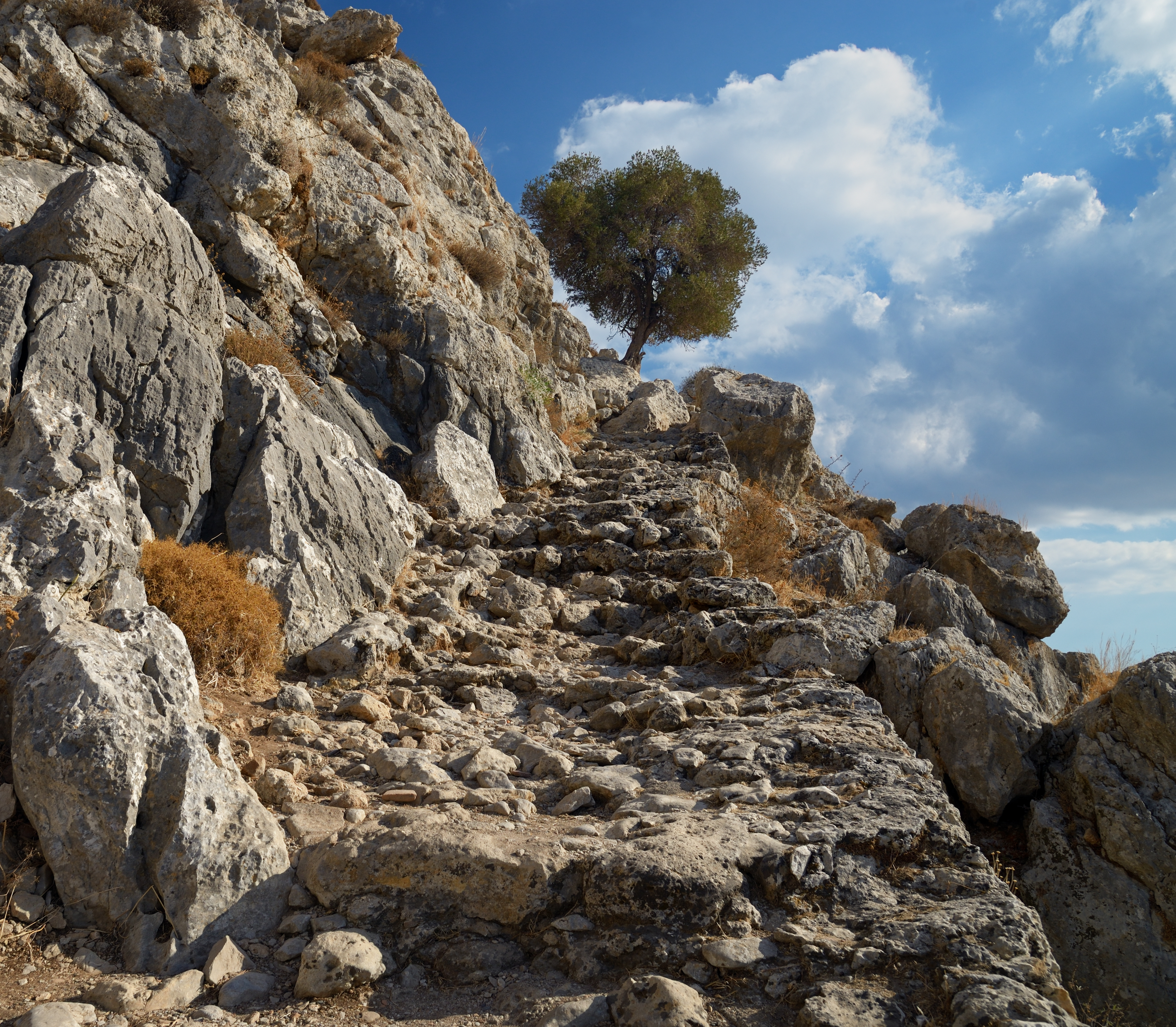
Remains of the road to the Castle on the south side

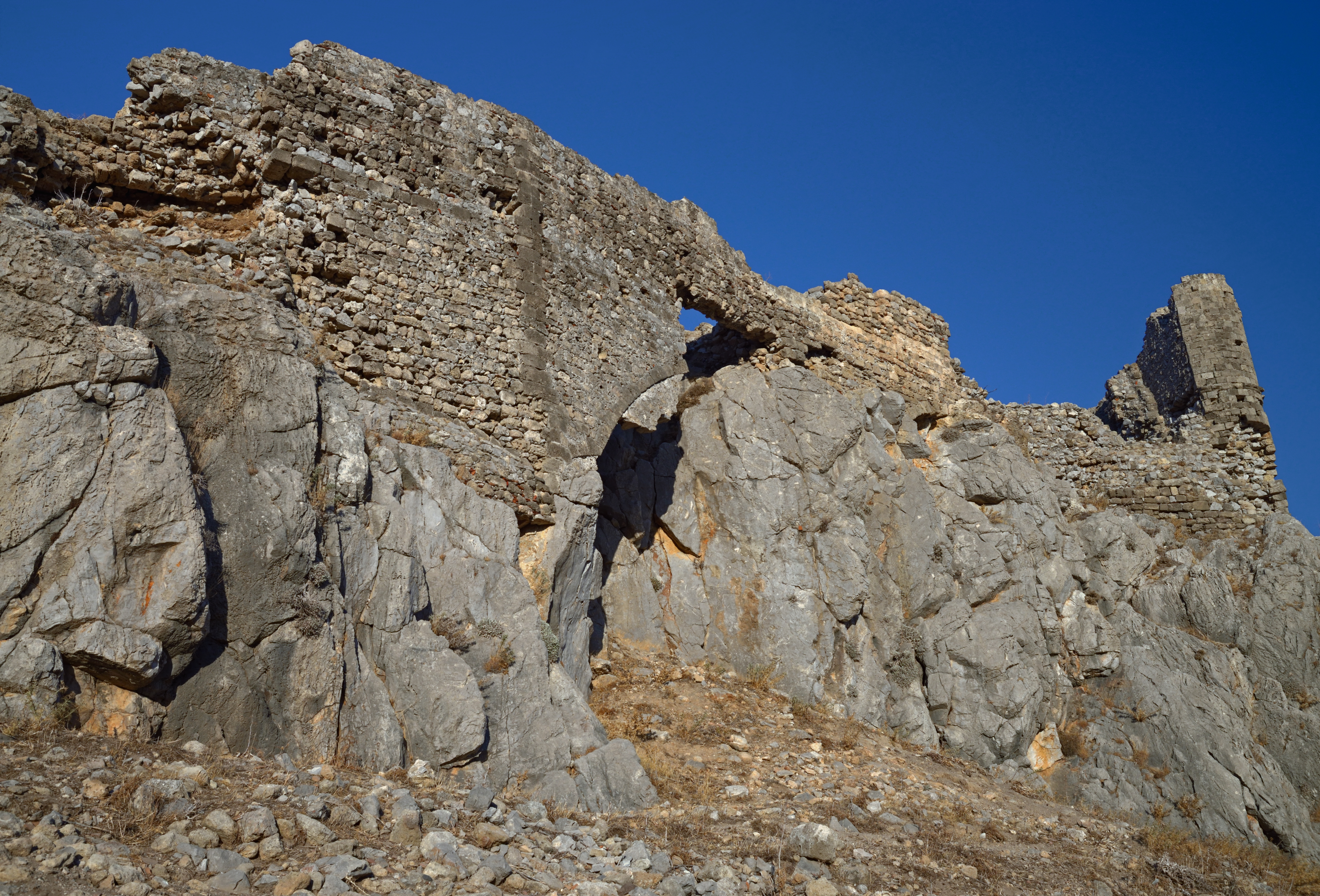
The arch ruins

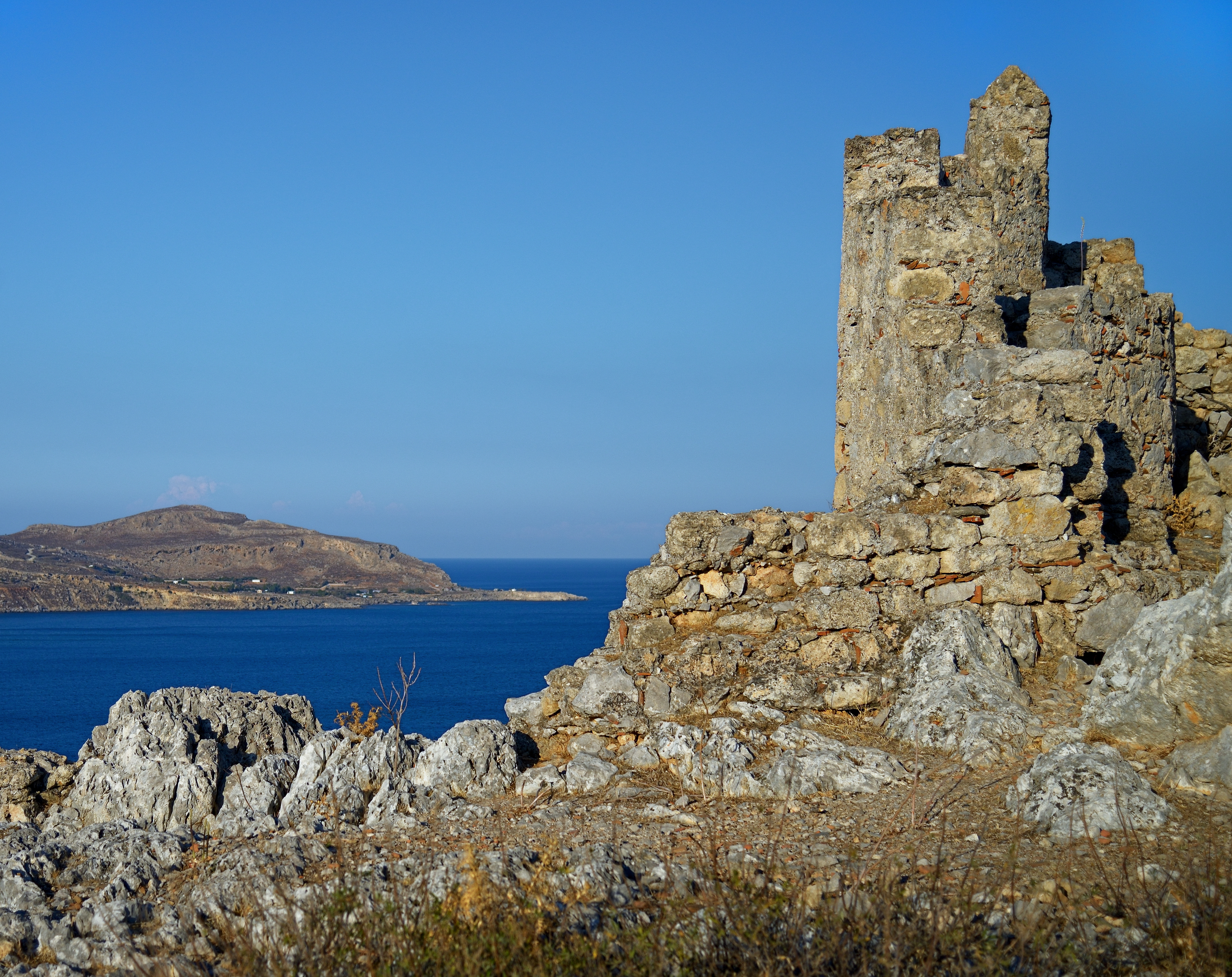
The ruins of the north wall

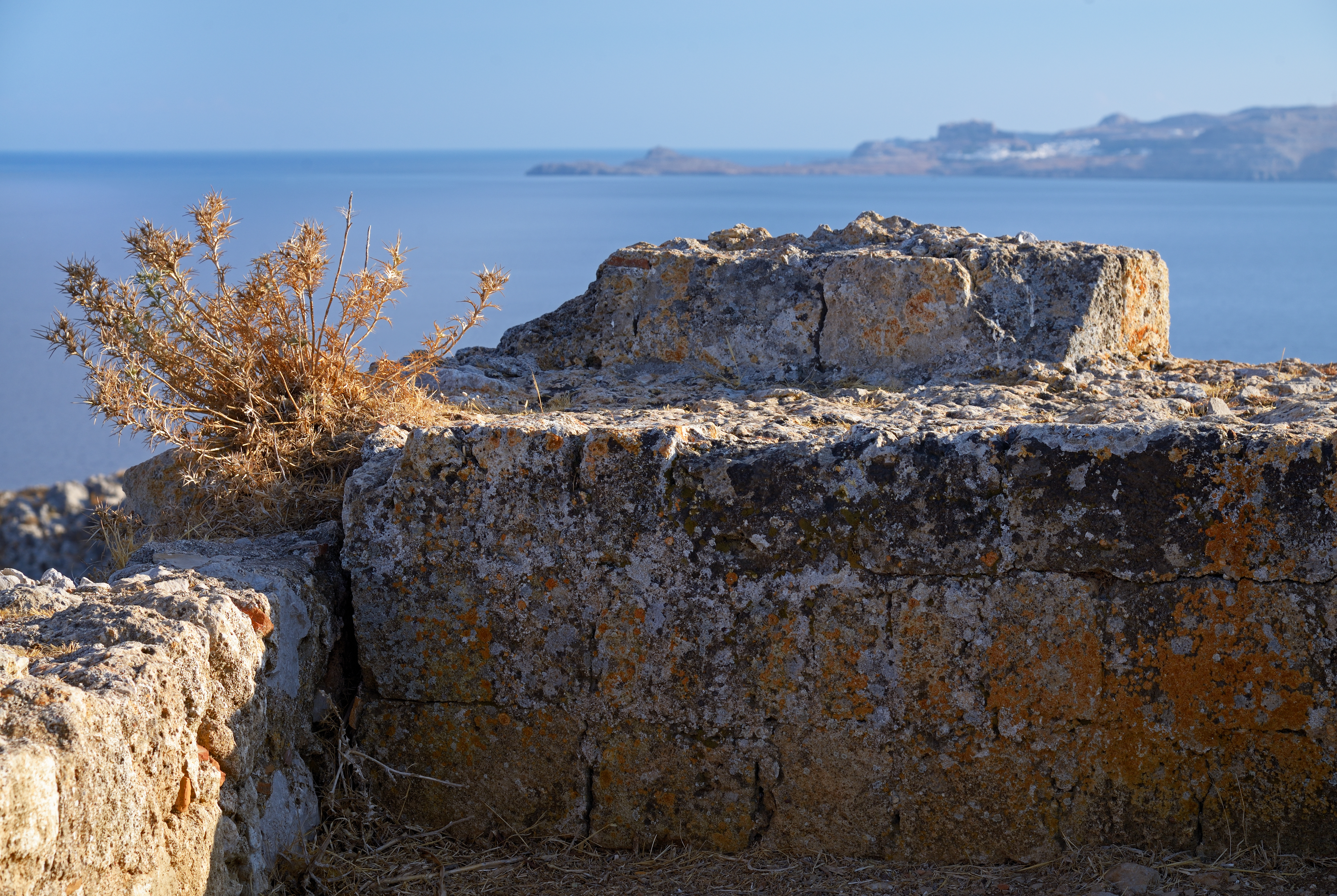
A fragment of the south wall

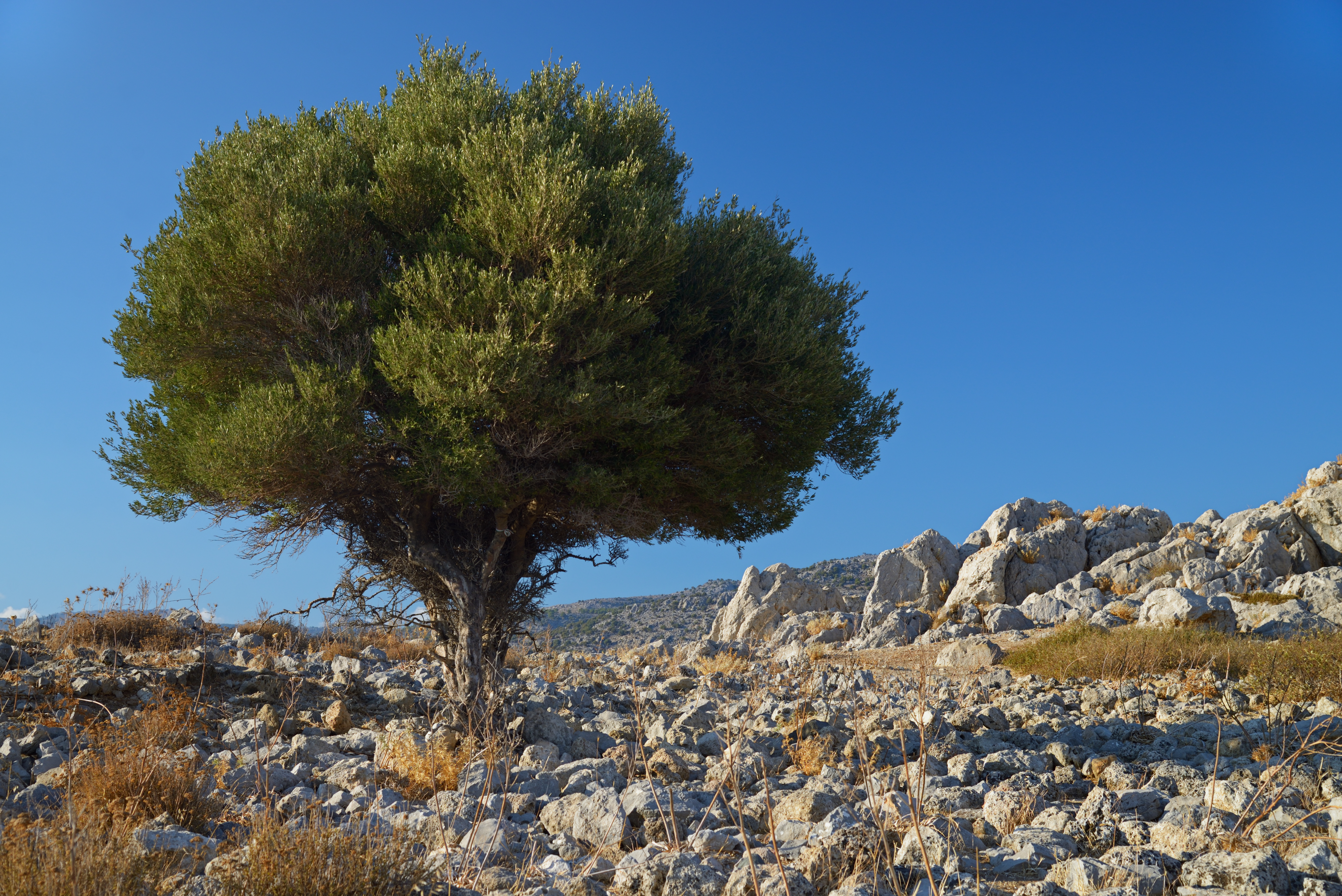
Olive tree at the Feraclos Castle ruins
