= Charaki =

Charaki Χαράκι
- Settlement
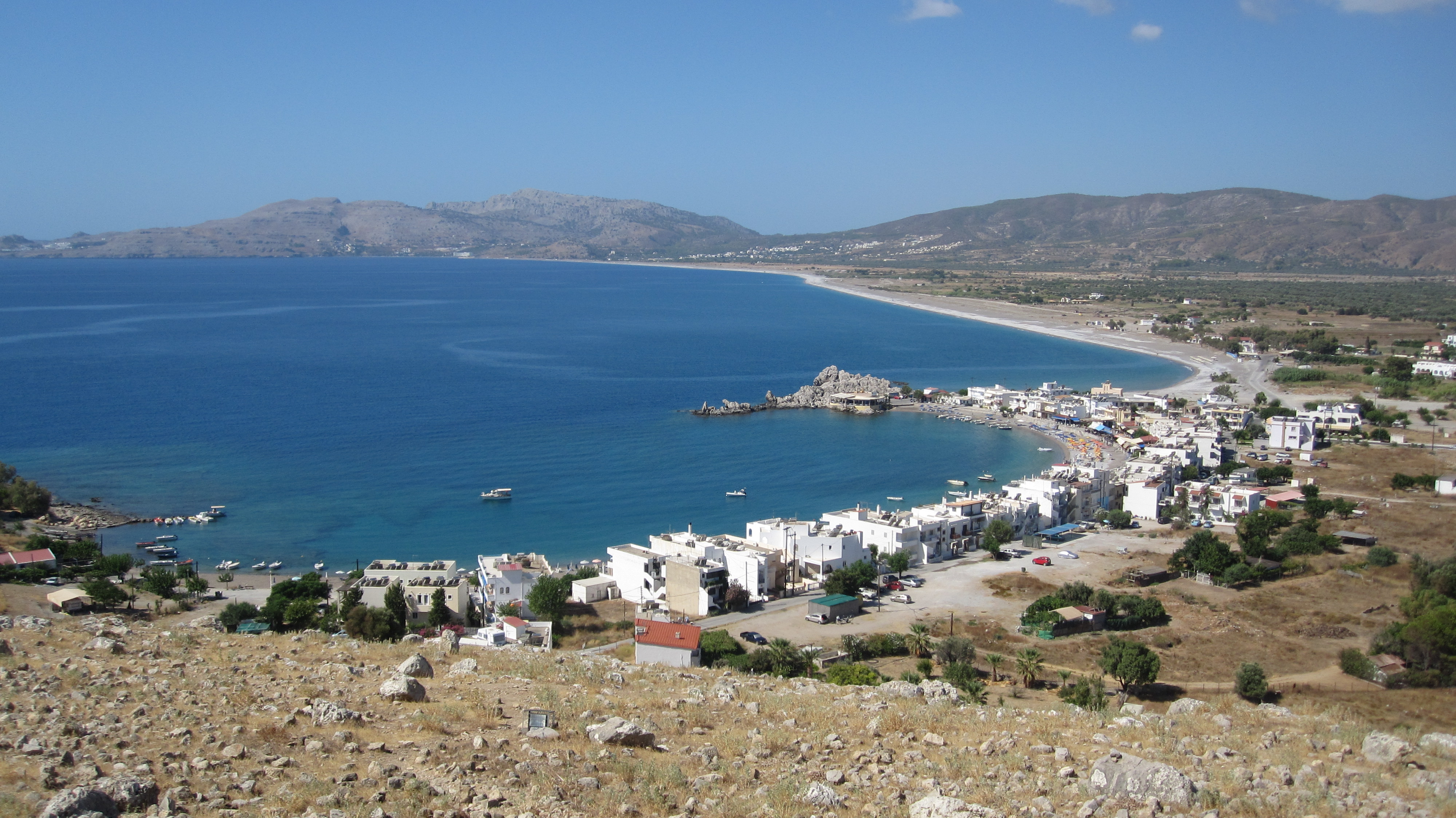

- Location within Greece
- Coordinates: 36°10′N 28°05′E
- Country: Greece
- Administrative region: South Aegean
- Regional unit: Rhodes
- Municipality: Rhodes
- Municipal unit: Archangelos
- Community: Malonas

Population (2021)
  - Community: 130
- Time zone: UTC+2 (EET)
  - Summer (DST): UTC+3 (EEST)

Charaki (Χαράκι) is a small fishing village on the east coast of the island of Rhodes, Greece. As of the 2021 census, it had a permanent population of 130.

== Overview ==
In addition to its fishing trade, Charaki is also a small holiday resort, with tavernas, restaurants and bars around its bay. Holiday apartments line the waterfront, and some housing developments have been built inland. The village is about 35 km south of Rhodes International Airport, and 10 km north of Lindos.

On the hill overlooking Charaki is Feraclos Castle (Greek: Φεράκλος), originally built by the Knights of St John. It was the last stronghold on Rhodes to fall to the Ottoman Empire. From the castle, there are panoramic views of Charaki bay, Agia Agathi beach, and the acropolis of Lindos in the distance.

Wild mountain sheep and mouflon inhabit the surrounding mountains, often gathering in the ruins of the castle at dusk. Most permanent residents of Charaki are from the nearby agricultural village of Malona.

== Population ==
Year	Permanent population
1991	97
2001	121
2011	113
2021	130

== Transport ==
Charaki is accessible via the island's main east coast road, with regular bus services operated by KTEL Rodou connecting it to Rhodes town, Lindos and other settlements.

== Tourism ==
Charaki's half-moon bay is noted for its clean waters, and in 2022 it was rated as one of the cleanest beaches of the Greek islands. Its waterfront includes tavernas and apartments, and nearby Agia Agathi beach attracts summer visitors.

== See also ==
- Feraclos Castle
- Lindos
- Malona, Rhodes

== Gallery ==
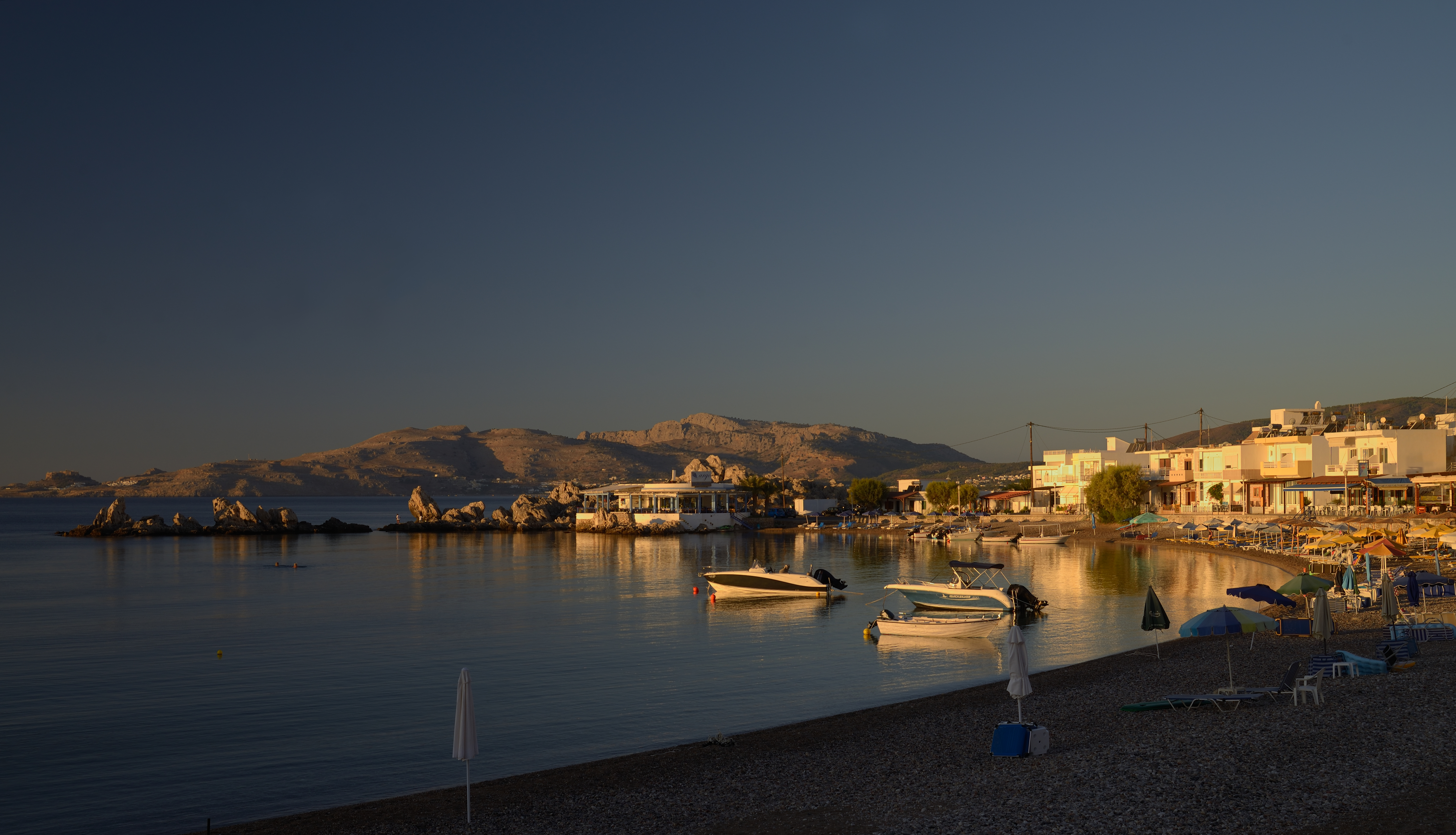
Dawning

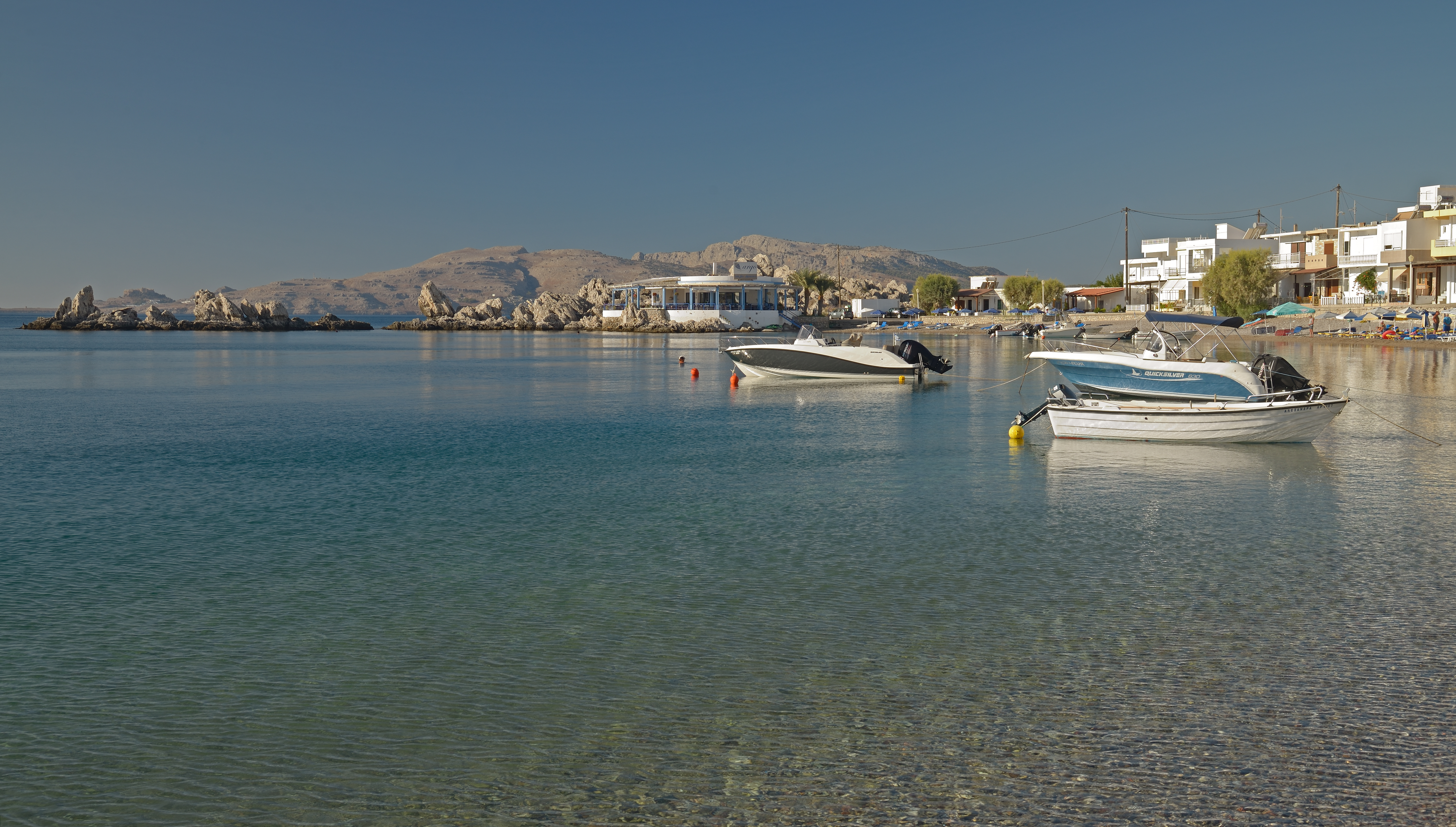
Morning

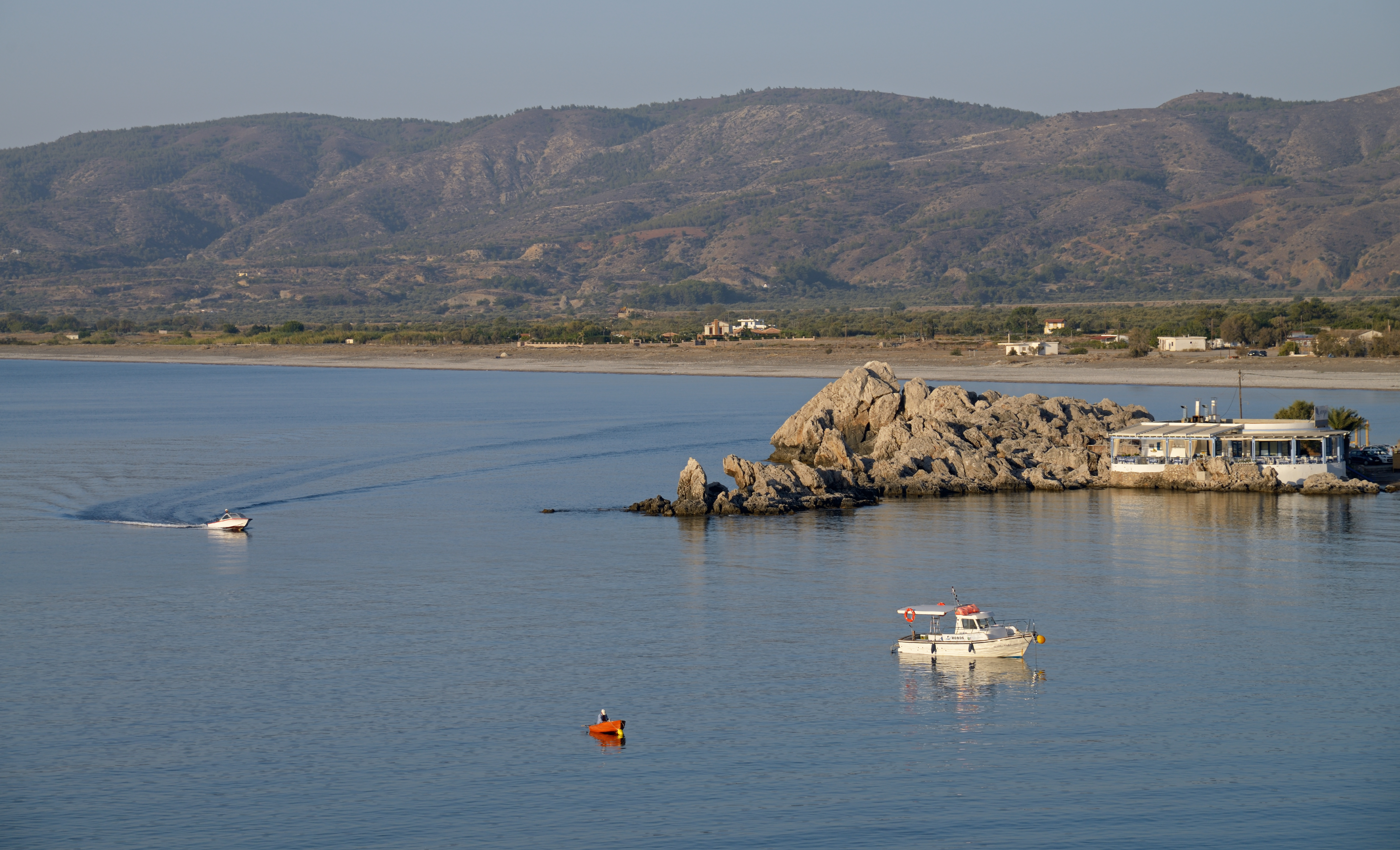
Peacebreaker

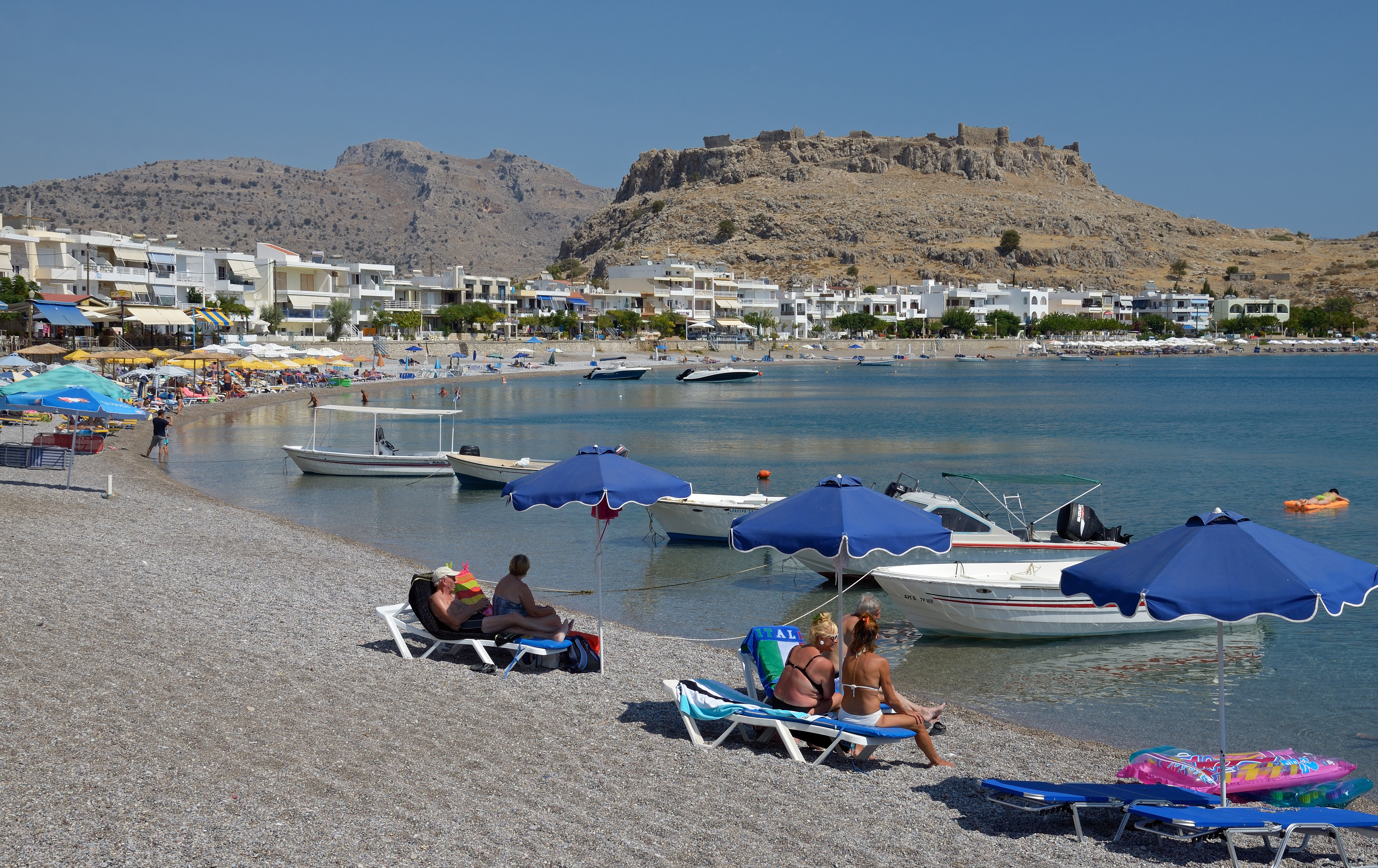
Plage with Feraclos Castle in background

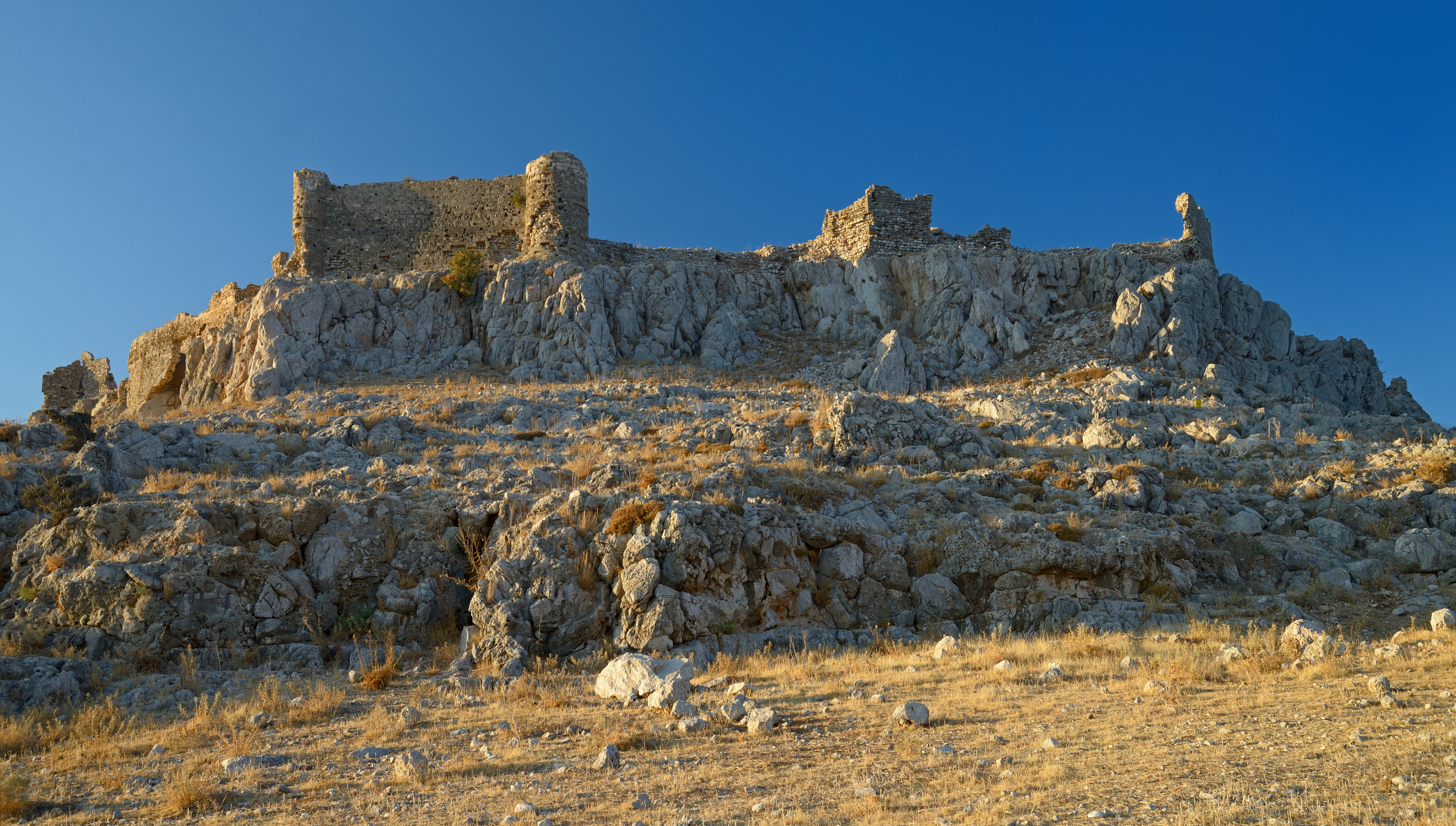
Feraclos Castle at sunset

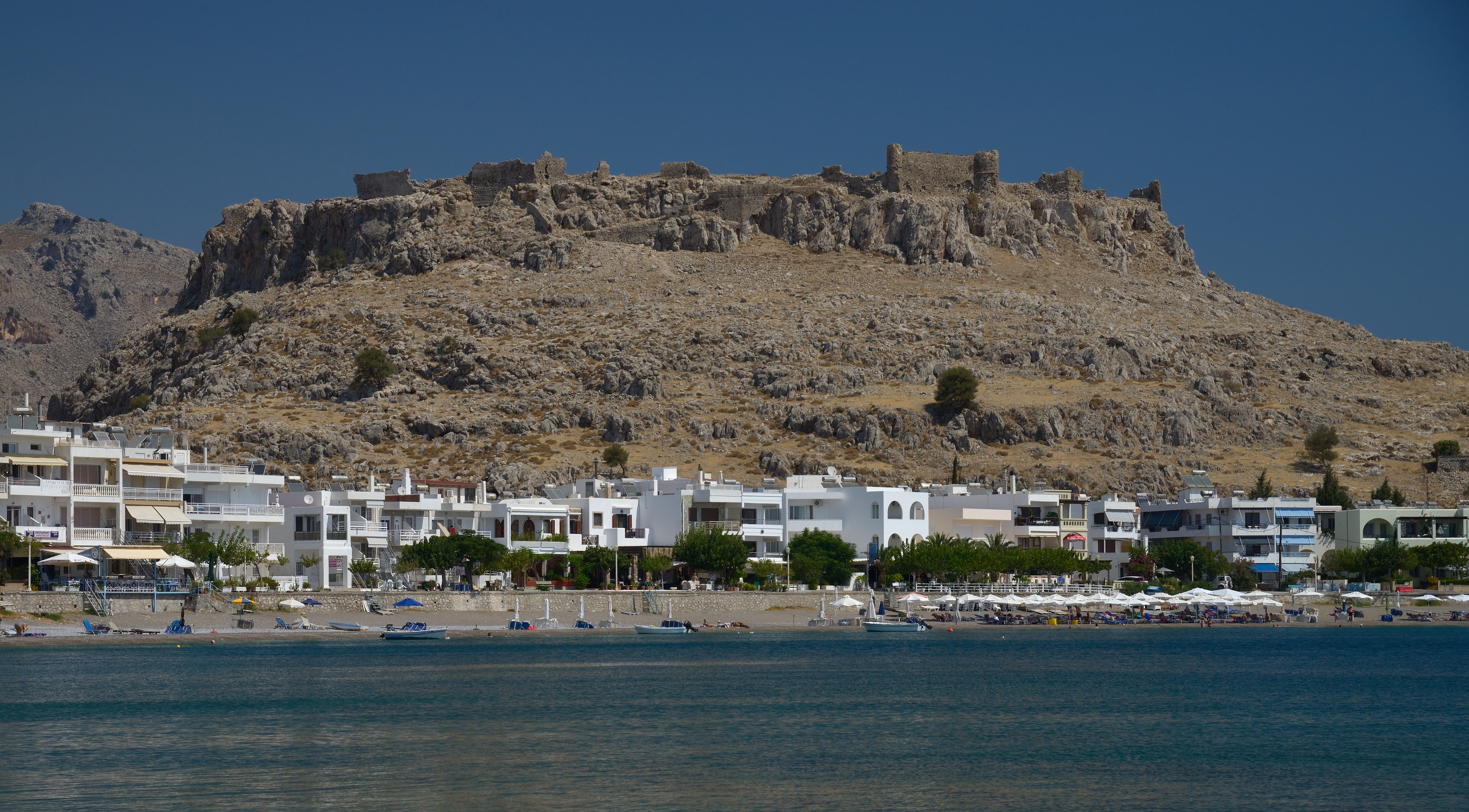
Feraclos Castle

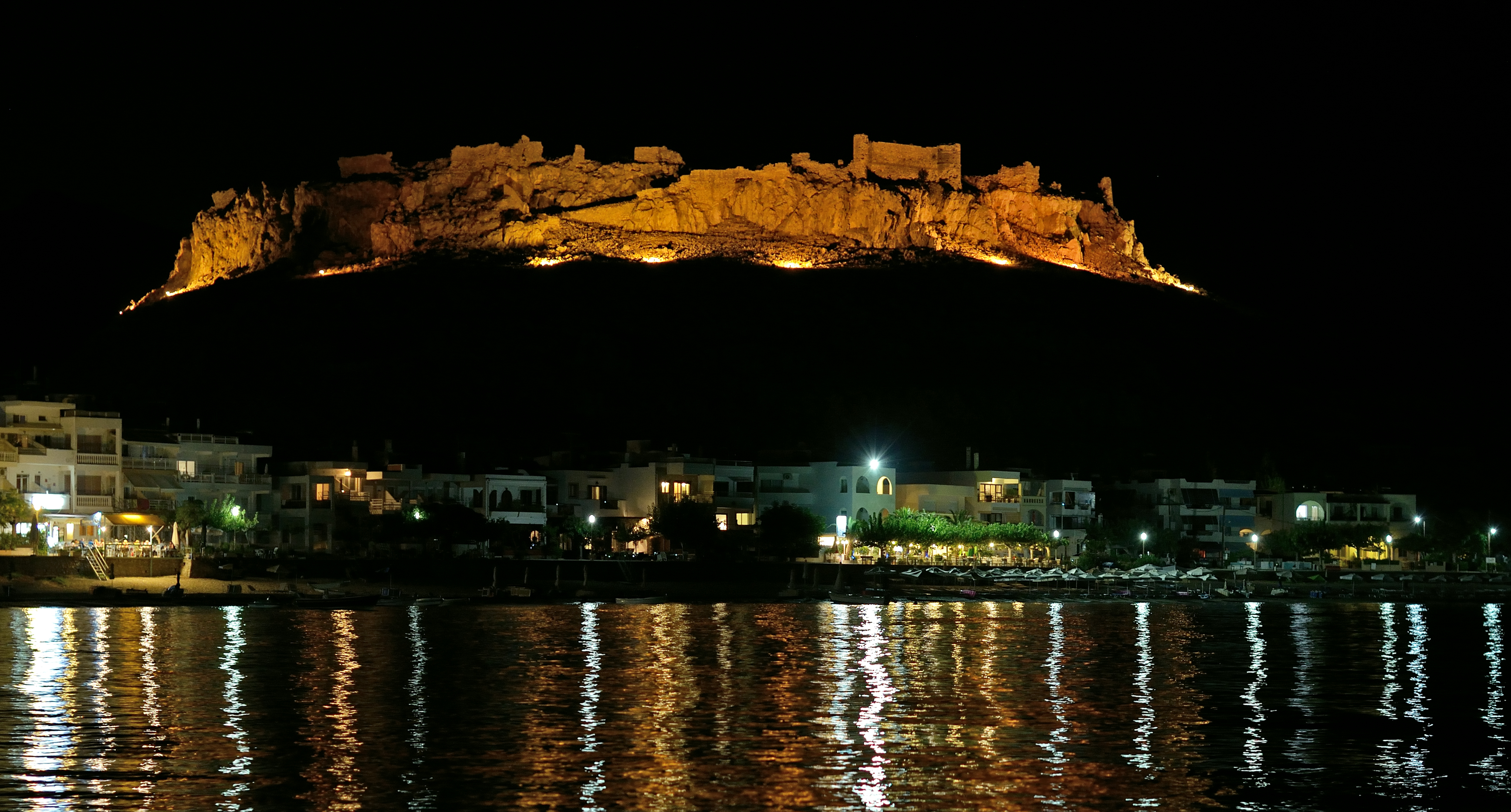
Feraclos Castle at night
