= Petrus Opmeer =

Dutch historian

- Portrait of Petrus Opmeer by Johannes Wierix, 1611
- Born: 13 September 1526; Amsterdam, Habsburg Netherlands
- Died: 4 November 1594 (aged 68); Delft, Spanish Netherlands
- Education: Leuven University
- Occupations: Historian and Catholic controversialist

Petrus Opmeer (13 September 1526 – 4 November 1594) was a Dutch Catholic historian and controversialist. According to his biographer Valerius Andreas, Opmeer was a friend of "painters, sculptors and architects", including Maarten van Heemskerck, Pieter Aertsen, Willem Danielsz van Tetrode, Frans Floris, Antonis Mor and Philip Galle.

== Life ==
Petrus was born in Amsterdam on 13 September 1526, the son of Pieter van Opmeer and Maria van Akersloot. Throughout his life, he demonstrated a great love of learning and had the family resources to pursue his interests. He was educated in Amsterdam at the school run by Alardus of Amsterdam and Nicolaas Cannius, spent time in Leuven, then went to Tournai to learn French and mathematics. At the age of 19, he married Sophia Sasbout, and went to Delft to study Greek with Petrus Resenius, rector of the Latin school. He was studying civil and canon law at Leuven University when the Dutch Revolt broke out, prompting him to switch to theology.

After the murder of Cornelis Musius, Opmeer offered his services to the Army of Flanders and was appointed secretary to the Council of War by Francisco de Valdez. After the Siege of Leiden, he returned to his native Amsterdam, until the city was lost to the rebels in 1578 and Catholic worship was prohibited. He then moved to Delft and lived there the rest of his life, dying on 4 November 1594, and being buried in the Oude Kerk. His son, Petrus Opmeer the Younger, published a number of his writings posthumously.

== Writings ==
- Vincent of Lérins, Een seer schoon boecxken voor die outheijt ende waerheijt des gemeene christen gheloofs, teghens die Godloose niewicheijden alder ketterijen, translated by Petrus Opmeer (Haarlem, 1561)
- Officium Missae apud Ecclesiam tempori quatuor primorum conciliorum generalium in usu fuisse historica Assertio (Antwerp, Plantin Press for Simon Pauli of Delft, 1570)
- Responsio ad VIII articulos, a Leone Empacio, adversus Assertionem suam propositos (Antwerp, Plantin Press, 1570)
- Opus chronographicum orbis universi a mundi exordio usque ad annum 1611, volume 1 (Antwerp, 1611). The second volume was the work of Laurentius Beyerlinck.
- Historia Martyrum Batavicorum sive Defectionis a fide Maiorum Hollandiae initia (Cologne, 1625)
  - Martelaarsboek, ofte historie der Hollantsche martelaren, welken in het christen catholyk geloof en godsdienst, soo ten tijde van de woeste heidenen, als der Hervormde nieugesinden seer wreed sijn omgebragt (3 vols., Antwerp, 1700-1702)
