= Crucifixion (Heemskerck) =

Painting by Maarten van Heemskerck

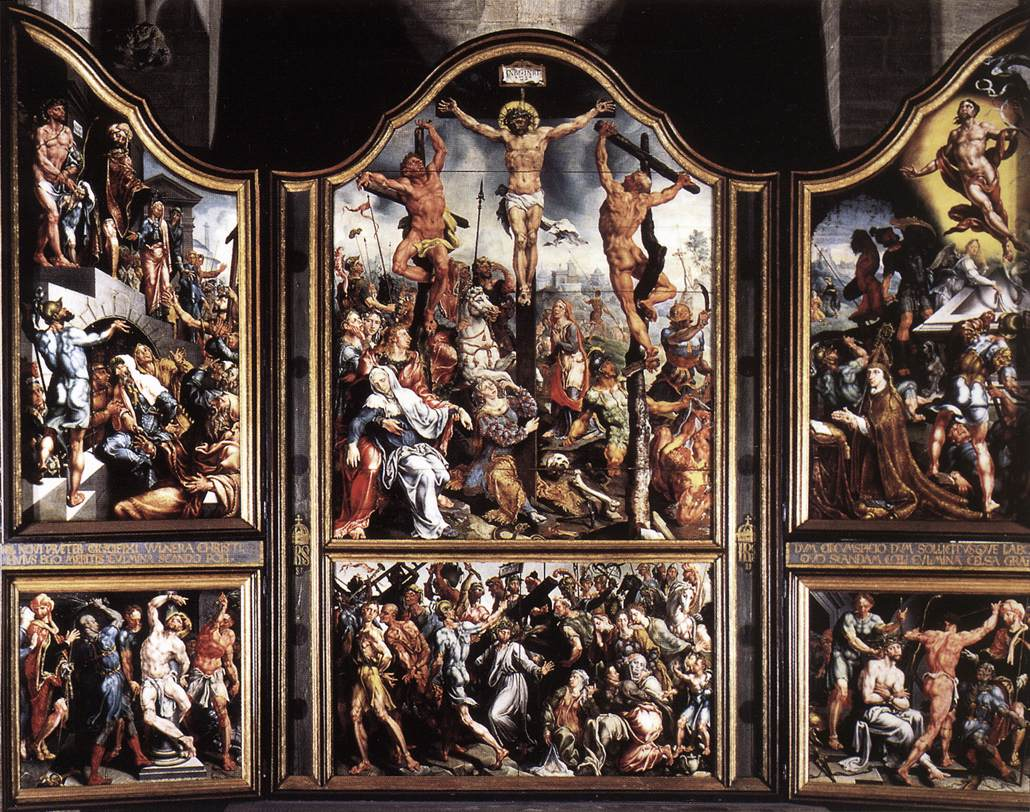
- Artist: Maarten van Heemskerck
- Year: 1543
- Medium: oil paint, panel
- Dimensions: 570 cm (220 in) × 405 cm (159 in)

Crucifixion is a 1543 polyptych by the Dutch Mannerist painter Maarten van Heemskerck in Linköping Cathedral consisting of a taller triptych above a shorter triptych, resulting in six panels in the front and four in the back.

== History and description ==
The central panel shows the crucifixion of Christ surrounded by figures, supported on the left with a panel showing Ecce Homo, and on the right with the Resurrection. The lower triptych shows Jesus carrying the cross along the road to Calvary, supported on the left with Christ at the Column and on the right with the Man of Sorrows being crowned with thorns. The archives of Alkmaar still have the original correspondence regarding the polyptych, which was paid for in periodic payments as it was installed in the Sint-Laurenskerk, Alkmaar. It was completed in 1543 to everyone's satisfaction. After the Protestant Reformation in 1575 it was removed to the Alkmaar city hall and in 1581 it was sold as being "too Catholic". The painting was documented by Karel van Mander in his Schilder-boeck in 1604, and since by then it was already in Sweden, his description is simply that it was "cleverly done":

T'Alcmaer was van Marten in de groote Kerck t'hoogh Altaer, een Crucifix, inwendich op de deuren de Passie, uytwendich d'Historie van S. Laurens, alles seer constigh ghedaen..

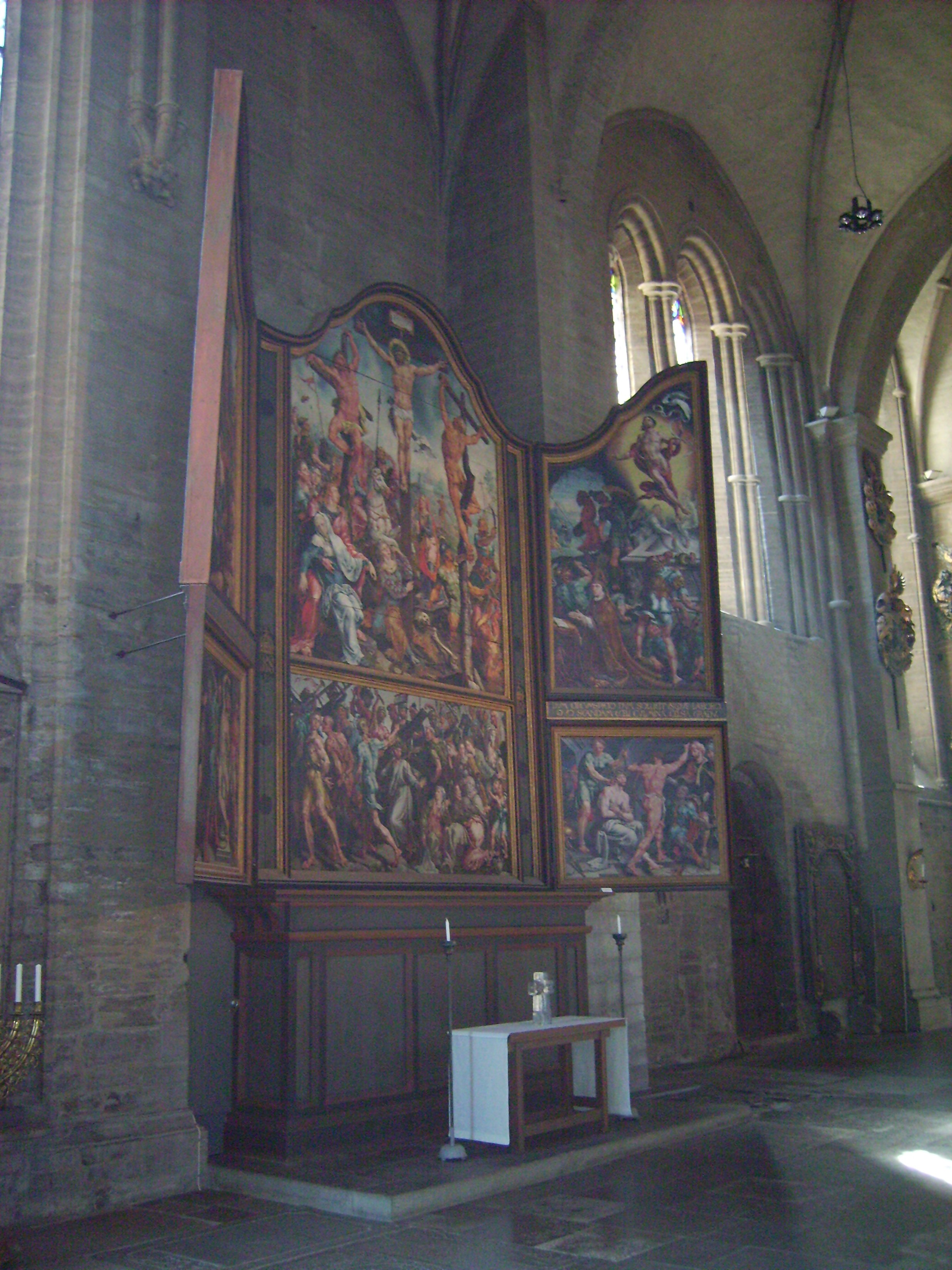
The painting seen in the church in Sweden

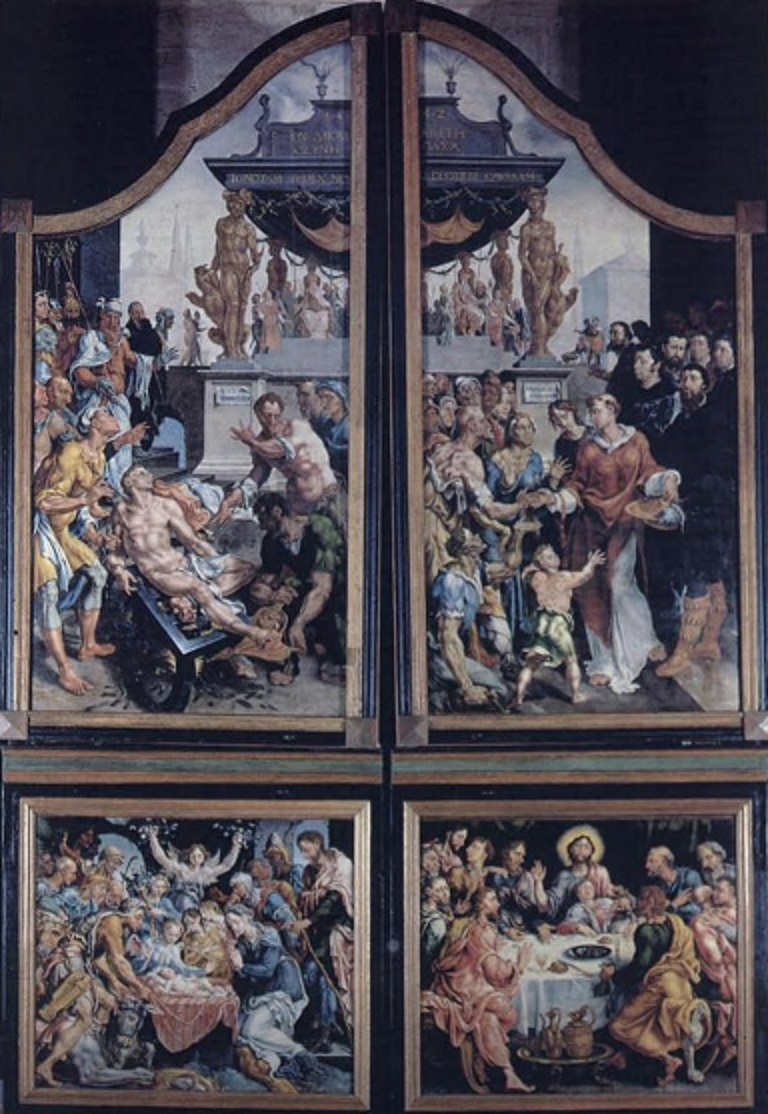
The closed doors show scenes from the life of St. Laurence

The painting is typical of Heemskerck's style after his return from Italy, showing his tendency to crowd figures to fill the space in each panel.

== Outer doors on show in Sint-Laurenskerk in 2018 ==
To celebrate the 500th anniversary of the church in 2018, the outer doors were temporarily displayed in the spot they once were. Originally it was planned to have the entire polyptych on loan, but the central panels were discovered to be too fragile to move.

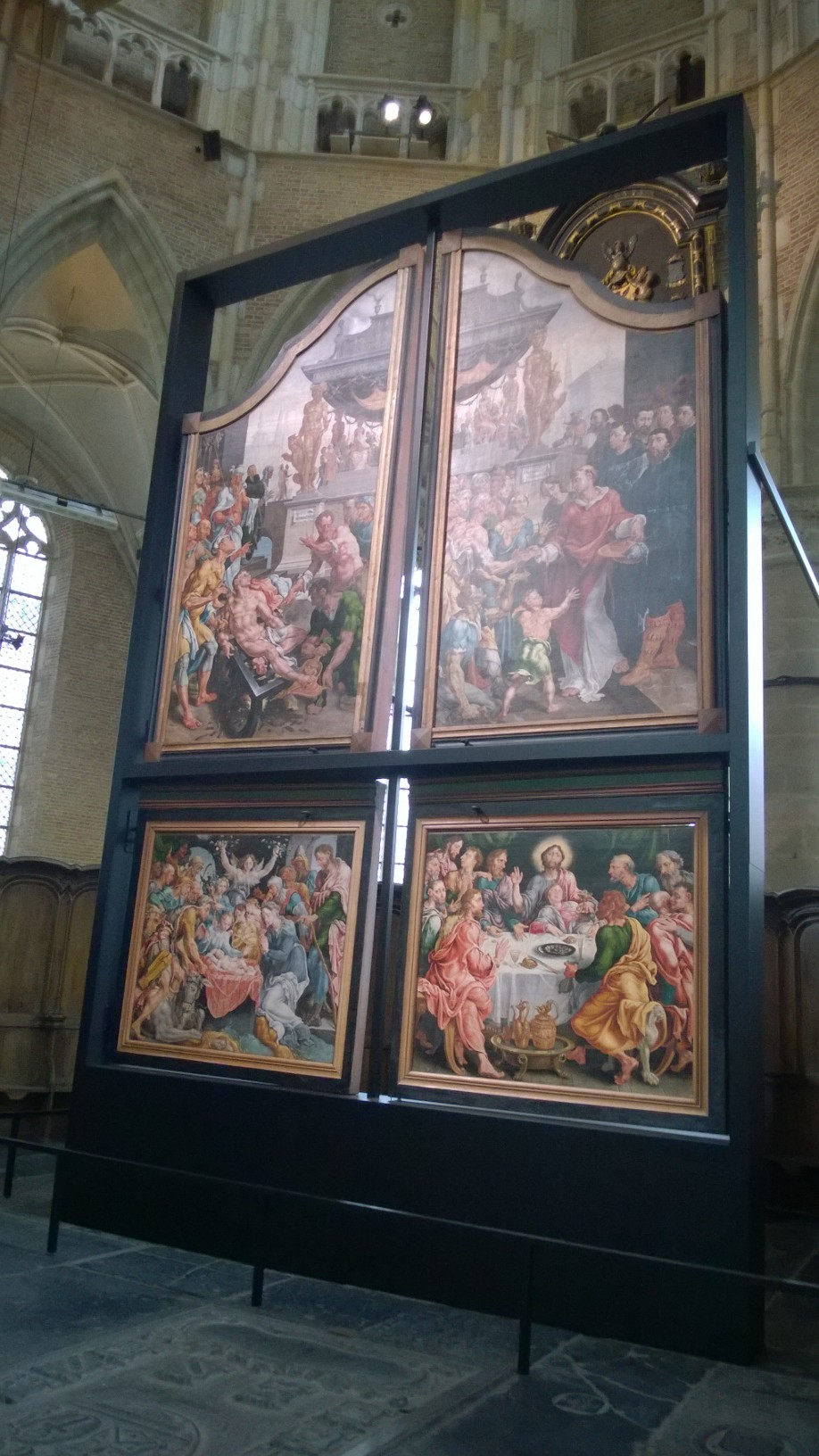
Double outer doors in the Sint Laurenskerk, as they would have appeared when the polyptych was "shut"

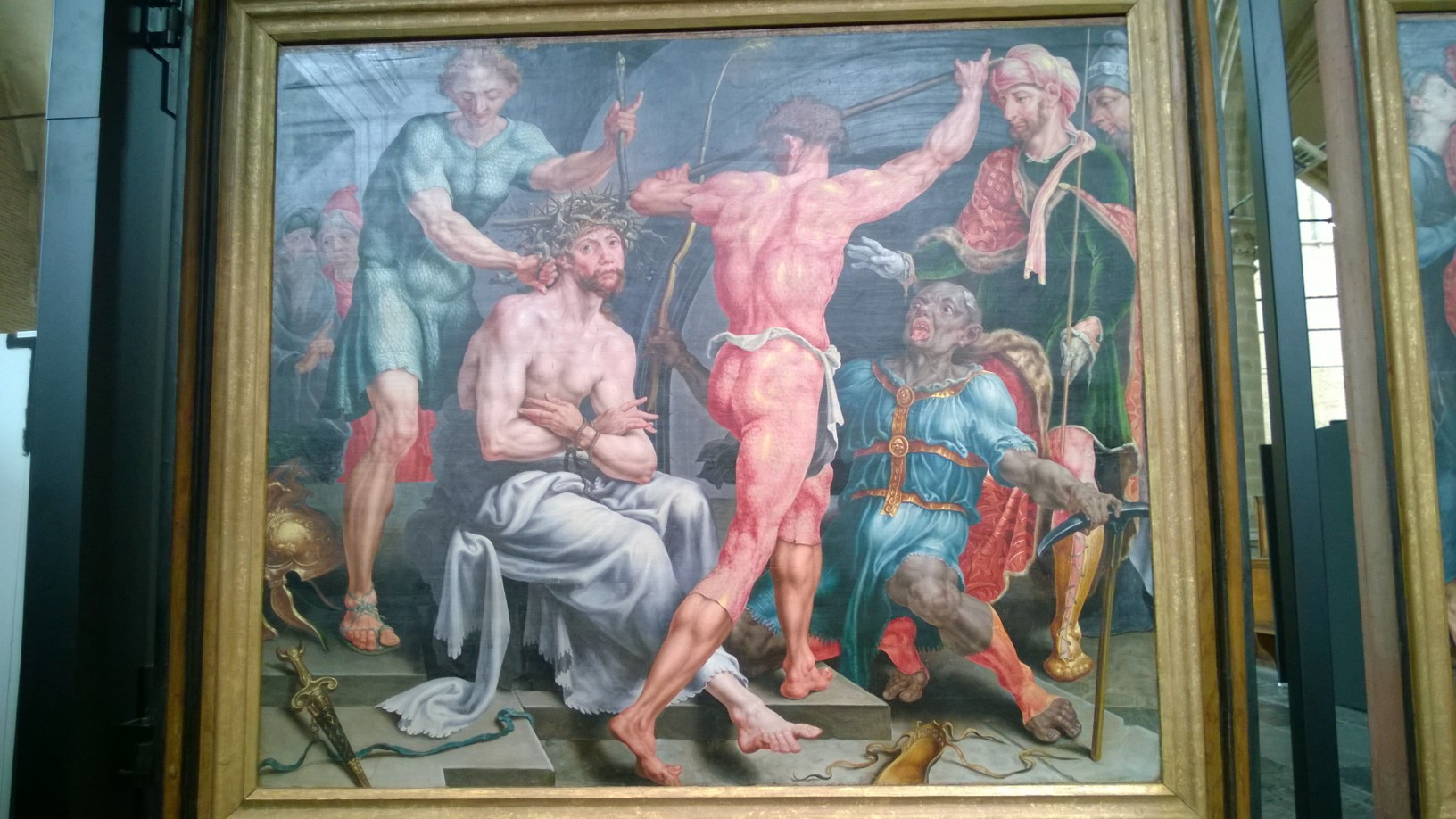
The "Crown of Thorns", a theme Heemskerck painted several times

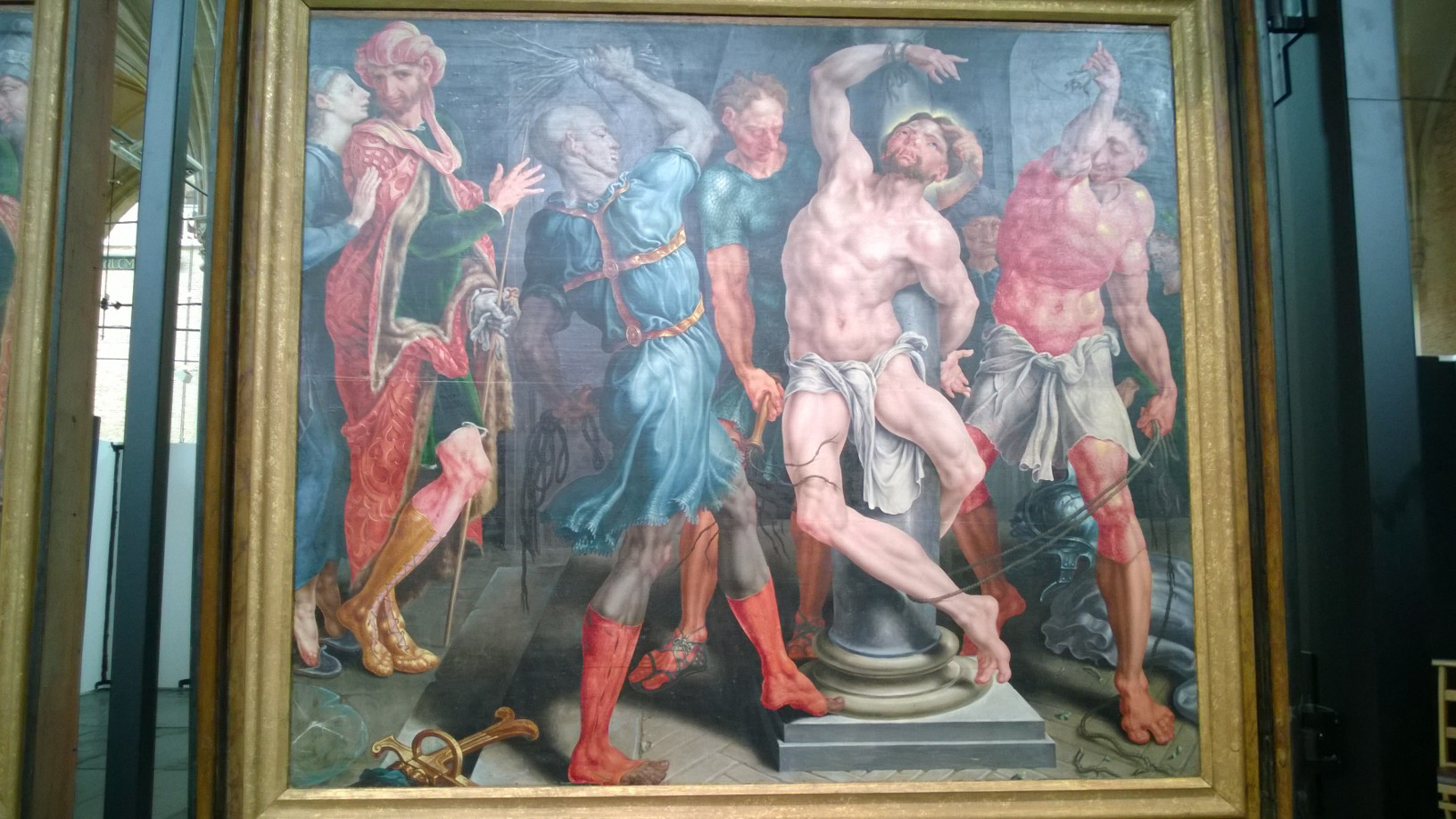
Christ at the Column

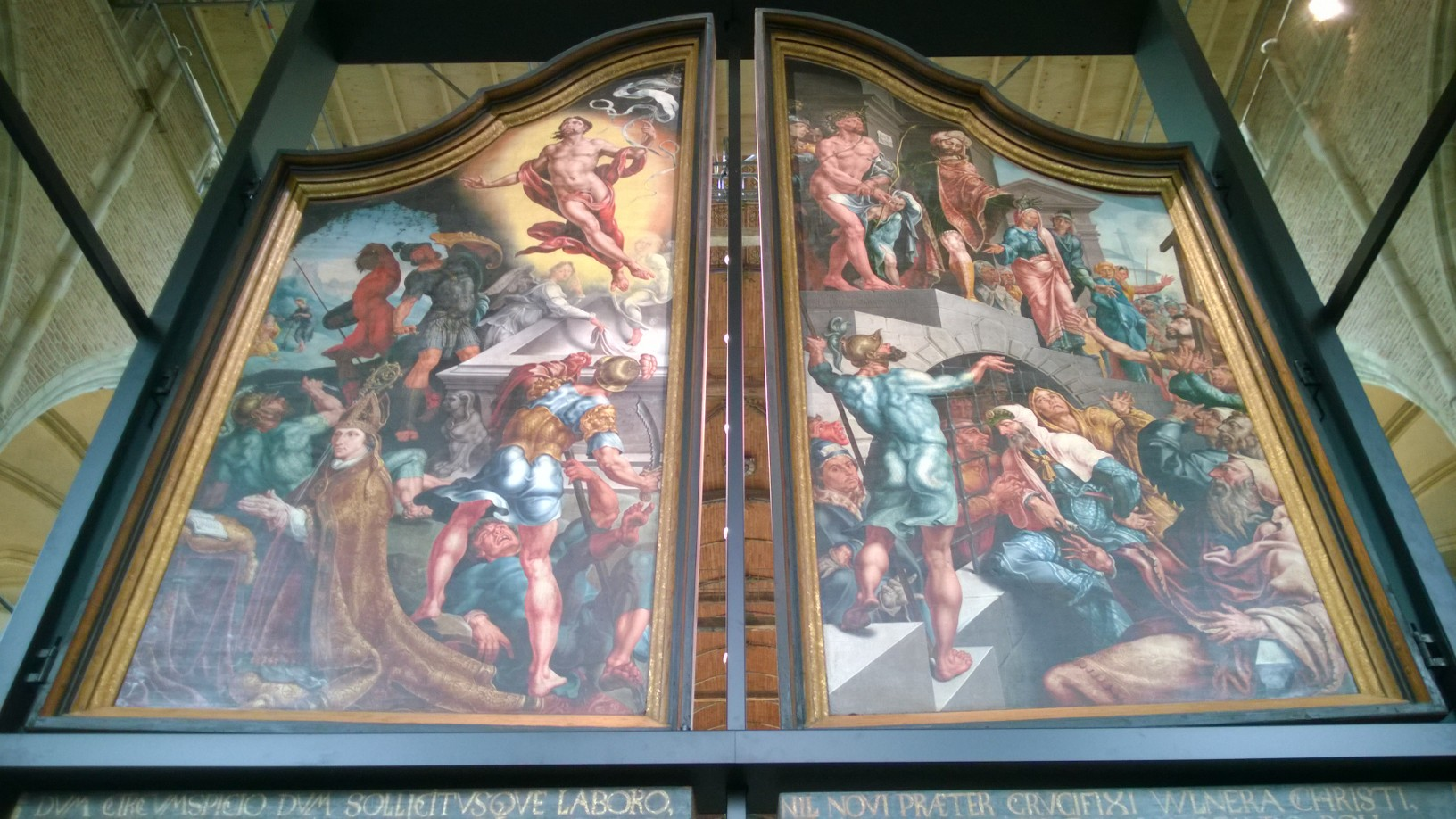
Top outer doors as seen from the back in the Sint Laurenskerk (in this position they would never have been viewed as they would be in the "shut" position against the central panels)

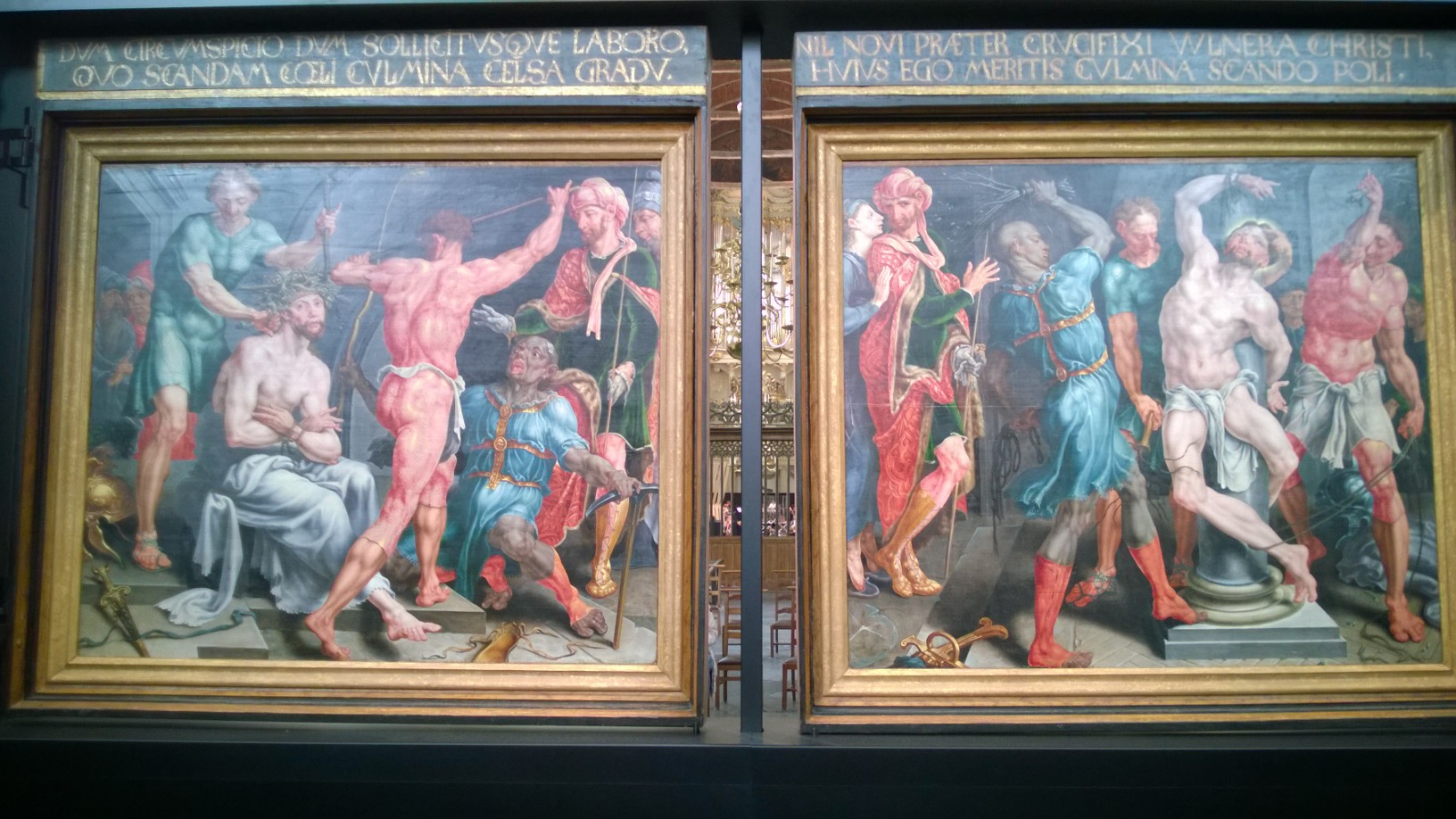
Bottom outer doors as seen from the back in the Sint Laurenskerk (in this position they would never have been viewed as they would be in the "shut" position against the central panels)
