= Dorpskerk, Heemskerk =

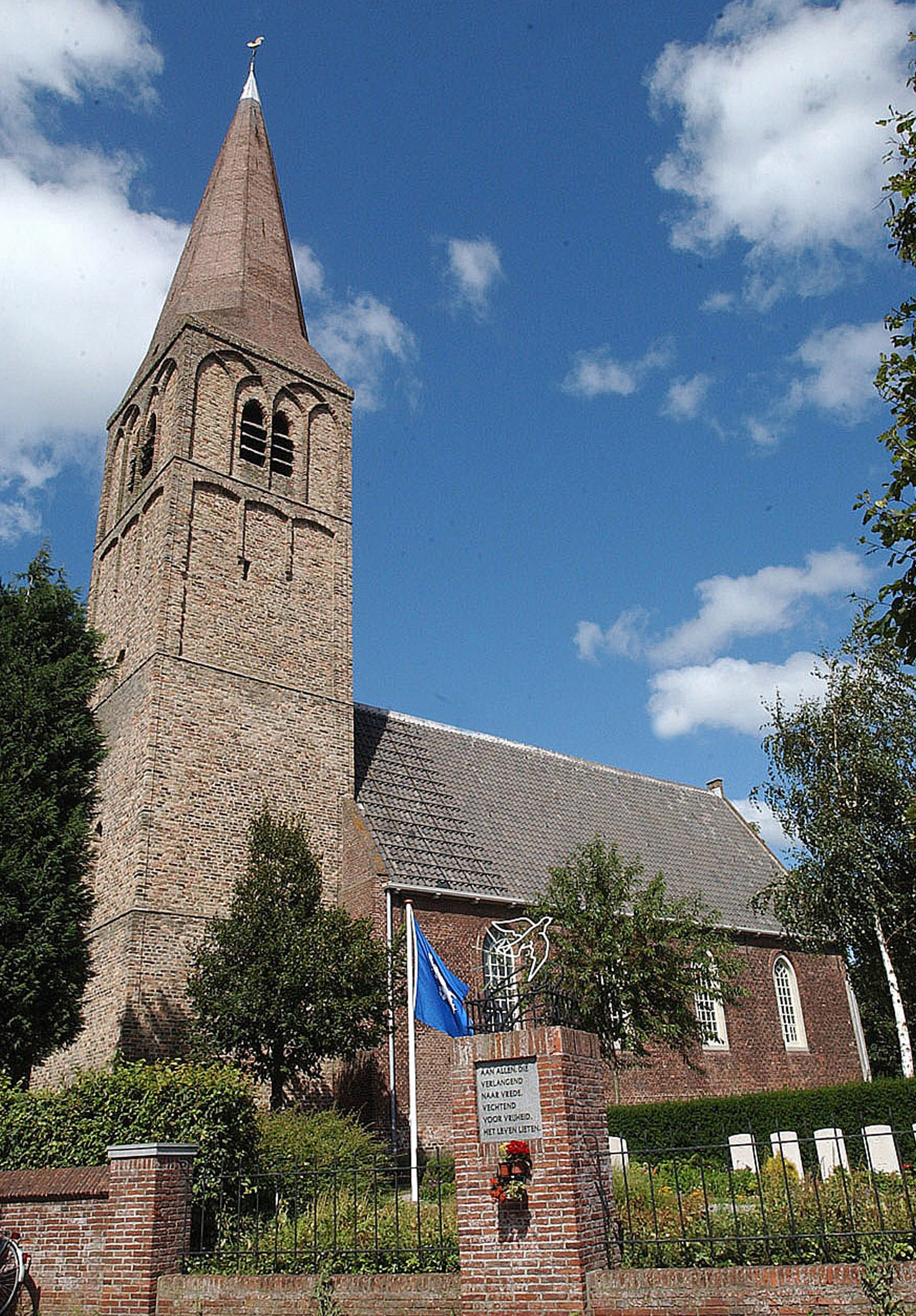
The church.

The Dorpskerk (literally 'village church') is a Protestant church building at Kerkplein 1 in the centre of the Dutch village of Heemskerk. Its tower is 13th-15th century whilst the rest of the building dates to 1628-1629.

== History ==
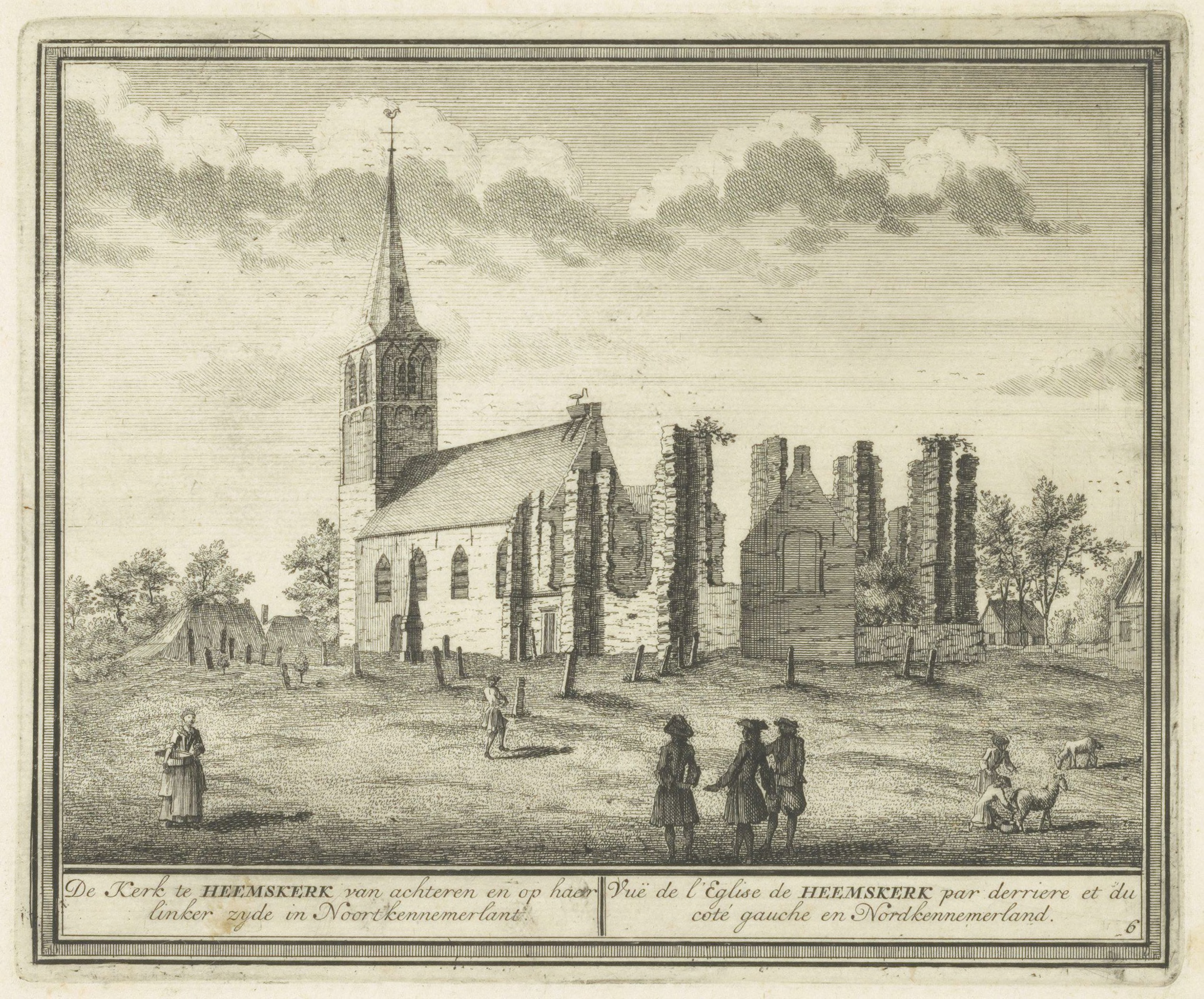
The church in 1768

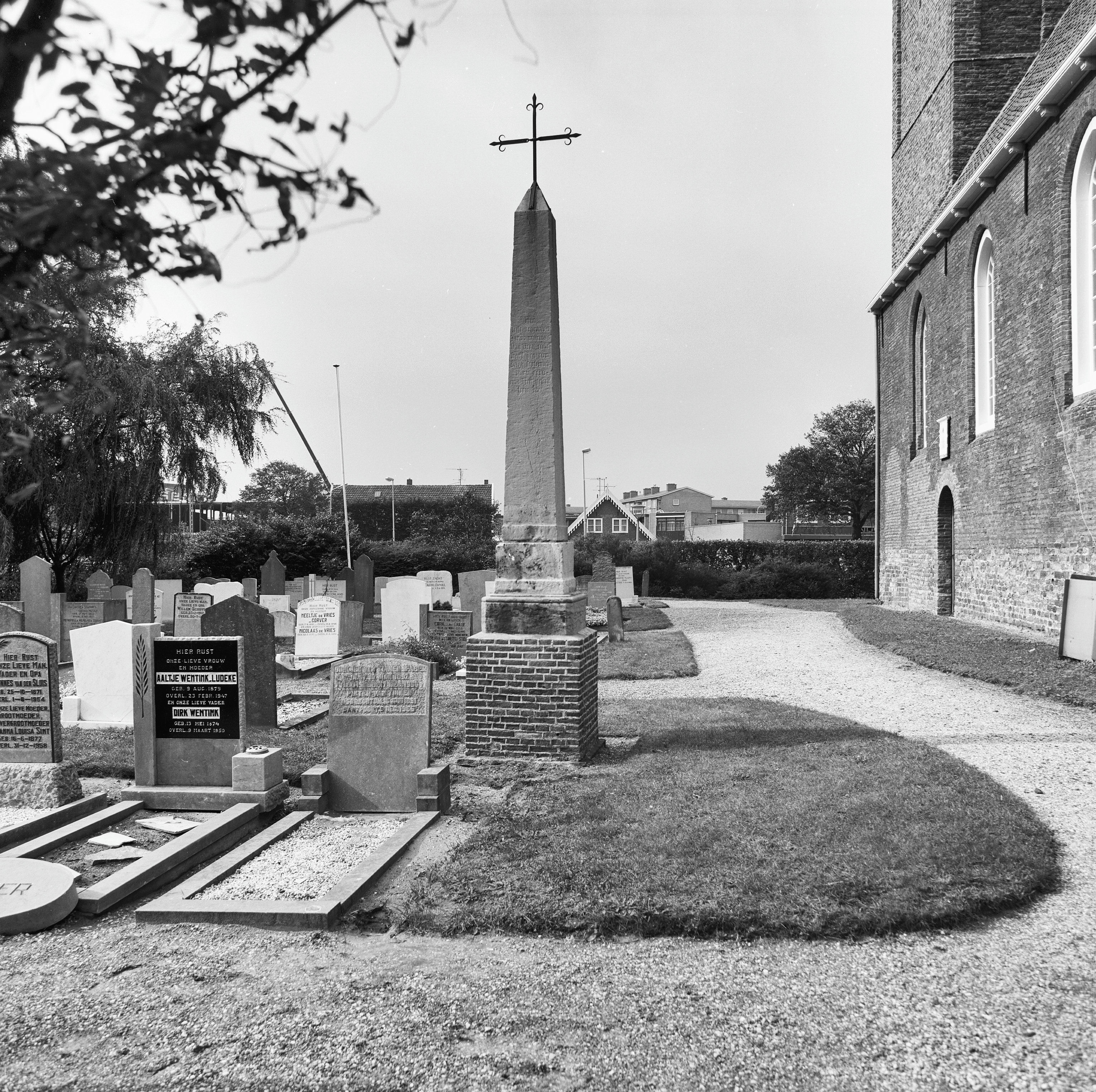
The obelisk in 1977

It is first mentioned in literary sources in 1063, though its appearance at that time is unknown. Over the centuries, a church was built on the site of the 17th-century one from tuff, a gray volcanic stone from the Eifel. The tower was first built in the 13th century from so-called kloostermoppen (large baked bricks usually used to build monasteries). The church and the main bell in its tower (the latter dating to 1464 and made by Steven Butendiic, a bell founder from Utrecht) were both dedicated to Saint Laurentius.

The substructure of the tower is Romanesque but the superstructure is Flemish Gothic, with the latter probably built some time between 1400 and 1450. It originally had a spire, which collapsed in 1585 due to a lightening strike (the repairs in a different stone are still visible). The tower bell could be used to warn the villagers of storms, fires or other dangers.

The village's noble families had their own burial vaults in two chapels of the church from the early 14th century onwards, whilst the Reformation led to the churchyard becoming a municipal cemetery. In its churchyard is buried Jacob, father of the artist Maarten van Heemskerck - a replica of his 16th century obelisk remains on the gravesite, whilst the original is now inside the church. During the Siege of Alkmaar in 1573 the Spanish troops demolished all but the tower to avoid it being set on fire. After their withdrawal the Protestants rebuilt it as a plain Gothic-style hall church with no choir. In 1728 the present-day rooster was added to the tower's top and in 1798 the tower became municipal property (as it still remains).

In 1800 the last remains of the two chapels were demolished and in 1829 further burials within the church were banned. A consistory was added in 1868. The tower bell was removed to be taken to Germany during the Second World War, but the ship intended to take it there ran aground near Urk and sank. After the war, the bell was identified and in 1946 it was returned to the church undamaged.

On 16 December 1943 a British Avro Lancaster with seven men on board crashed in the Kruisberg dunes near the village and were buried in the churchyard, with a memorial unveiled near their graves on 3 May 1987. Each of the seven graves has been adopted by pupils of a different village school, who leave floral tributes there on 4 May and 16 December. The tower was restored in 1970-1973 and 2012-2013 and is now a rijksmonument. Since 1967 both the tower and church have been rijksmonuments.

== Gallery ==
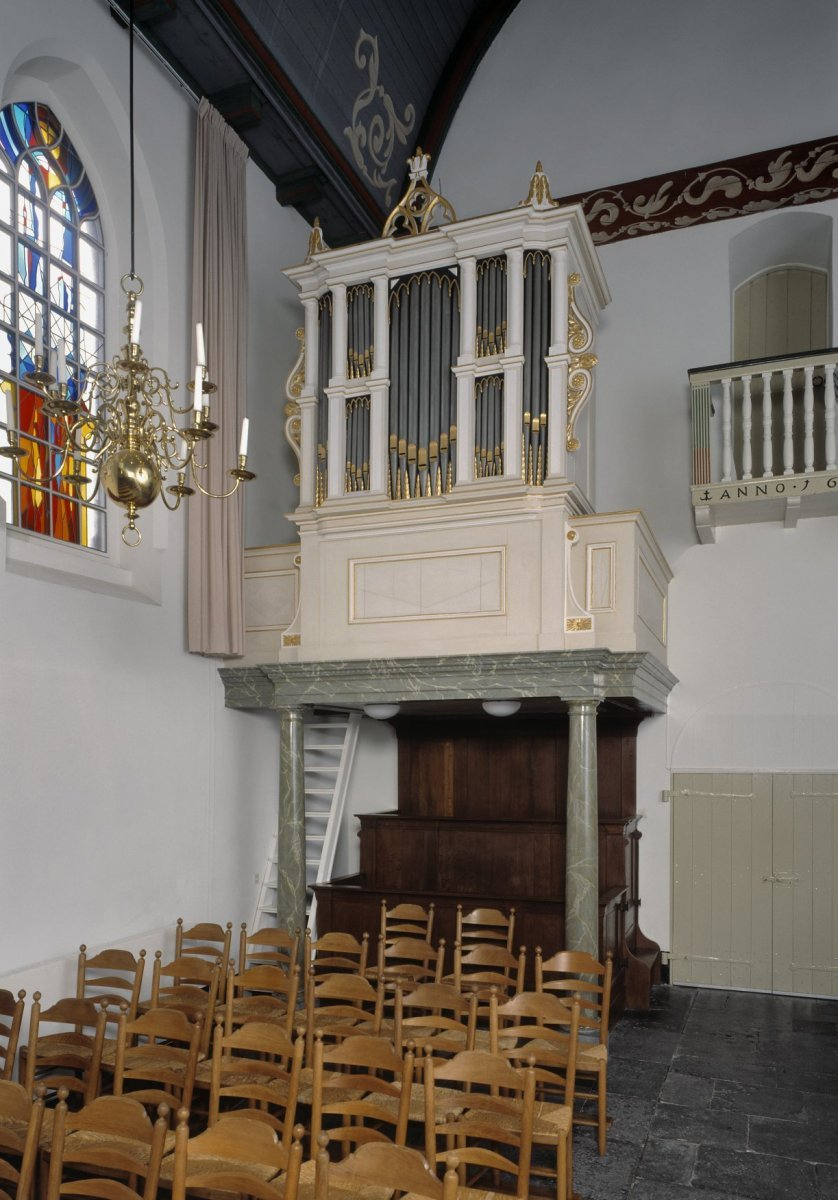
Single-keyboard organ, made in 1851 by H. Knipscheer

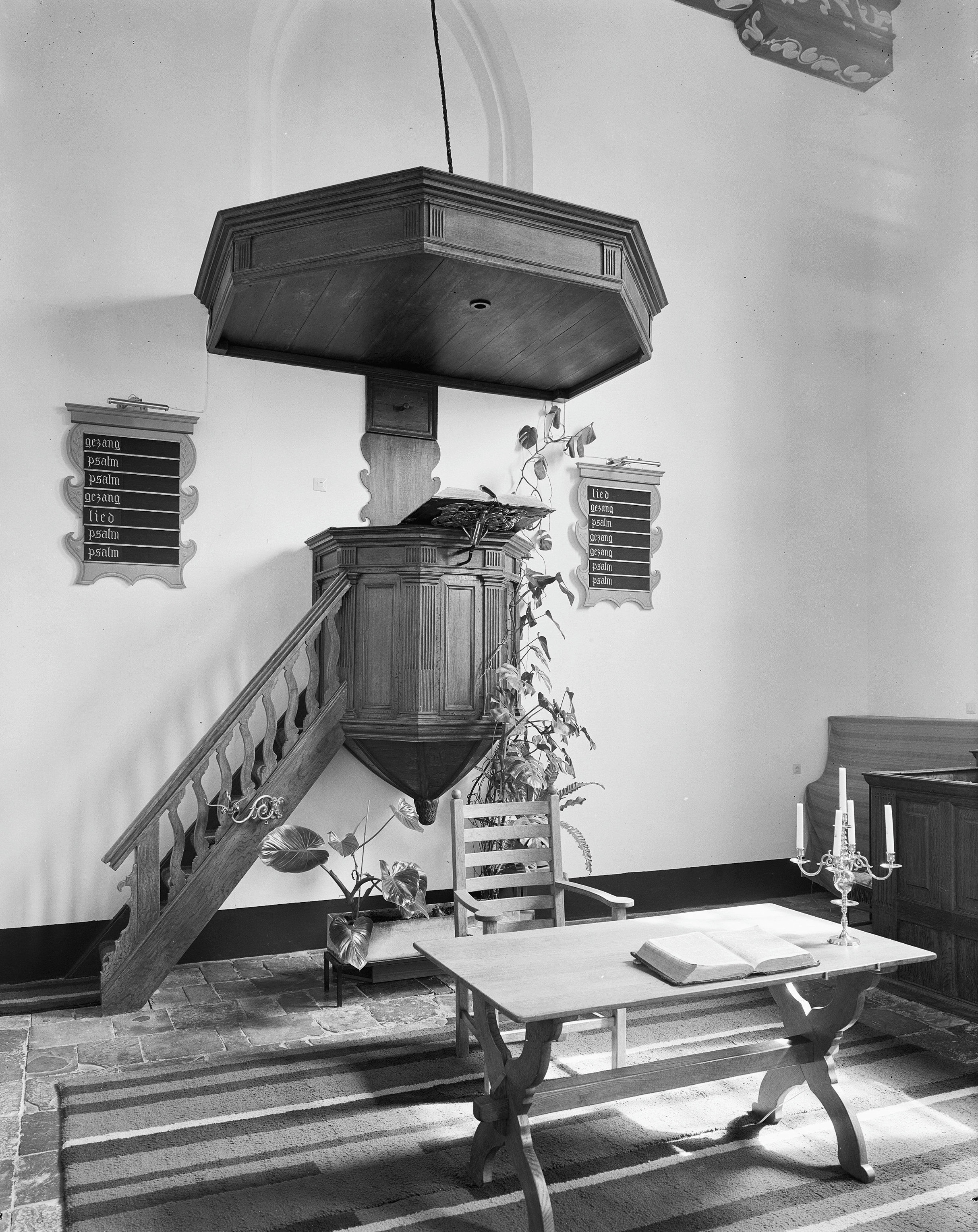
1629 pulpit

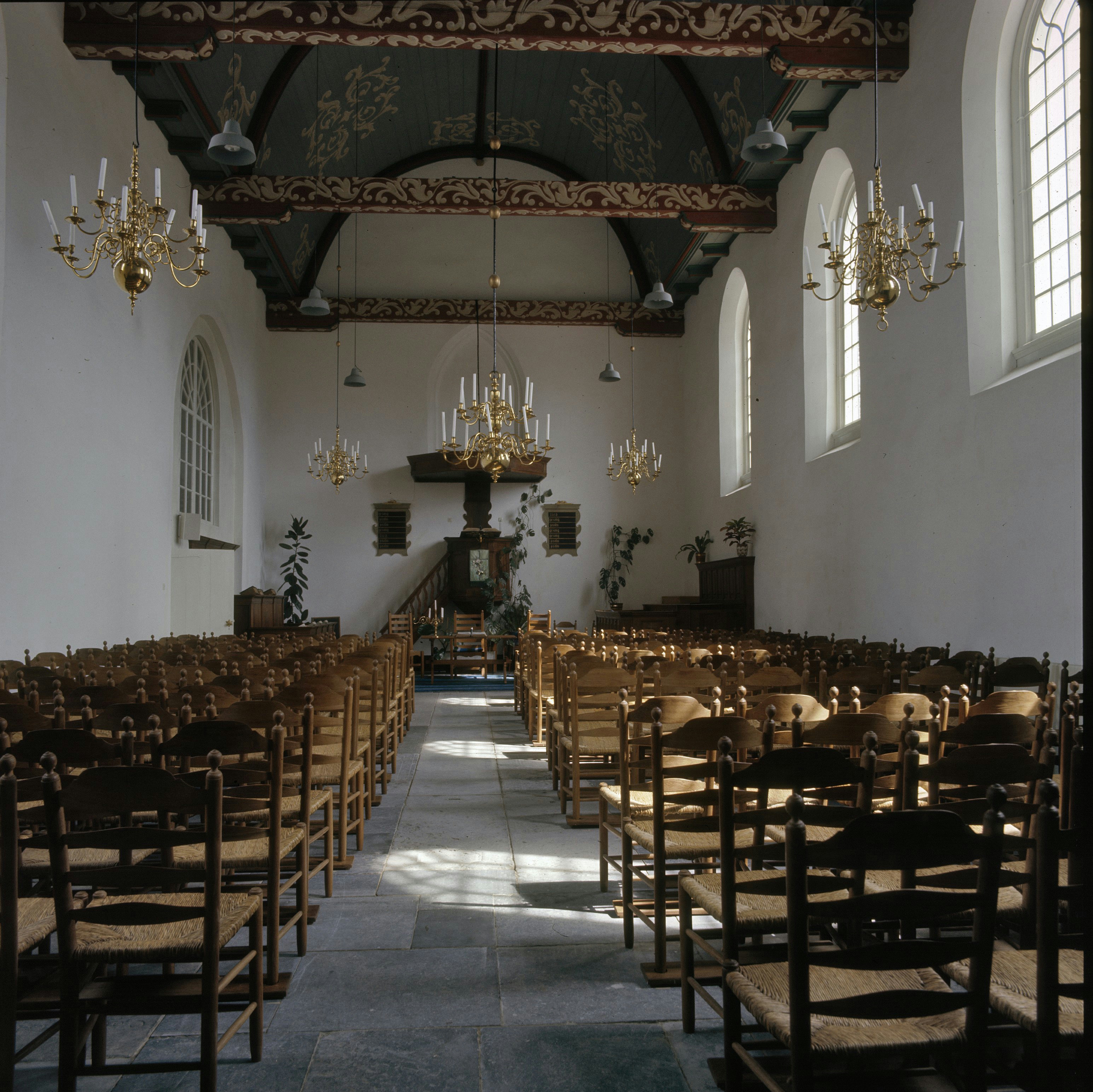
Interior looking east

== External links (in Dutch) ==
- Dorpskerk en Kerkhof
- Official site

52°30′37.21″N 4°40′16.85″E
