= Self-Portrait with the Colosseum =

Painting by Maarten van Heemskerck

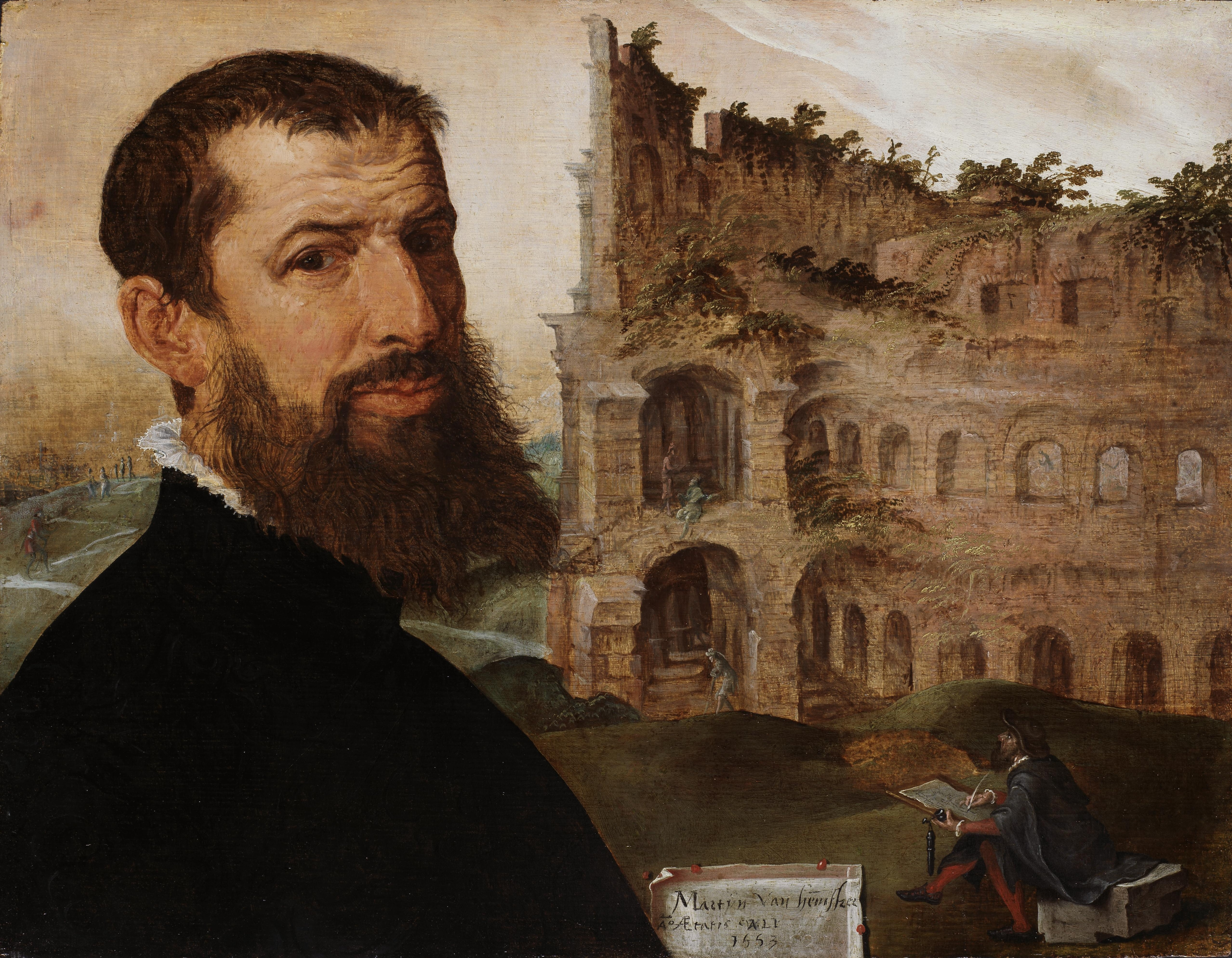
- Artist: Maarten van Heemskerck
- Year: 1553
- Medium: oil on canvas
- Dimensions: 42.2 cm × 54 cm (16.6 in × 21 in)
- Location: Fitzwilliam Museum, Cambridge

Self-Portrait with the Colosseum is an oil on canvas painting by the Dutch Golden Age artist Maarten van Heemskerck, from 1553. It is held in the Fitzwilliam Museum, in Cambridge.

== History and description ==
This painting shows the artist in the role of Grand tourist with the Colosseum in the background. It is signed and dated lower center MARTYN VAN HEMSKER AO AETATUS SUA LV 1553. It shows the artist twice; once in bust form looking at the viewer as if to say "Behold the wonders of Rome!" and again as an artist sketching the Colosseum. Heemskerck painted it upon his arrival in Italy whereupon it came into the collection of Anton Perrenot de Granvella (d. 1586). Unlike what the arrangement would have the observer believe, this was not painted 'en plein air' because all paintings were created in the studio until well into the 18th century.

The image of the Colosseum has been identified with an undated sketch currently in Berlin that itself was a model for Pieter Jansz. Saenredam for his 1631 painting. Saenredam is known to have had in his possession many sketches by Heemskerck that he used as models. A description of the sketches of ruins that Heemskerck made while in Rome was documented by Karel van Mander in his Schilder-boeck, who mentioned the patronage of a Cardinal (presumably Cardinal Granvelle). Many of these were later engraved and published by Philips Galle in 1569 as the Clades series, or Inventiones Heemskerkianiae Ex Utroque Testamento.

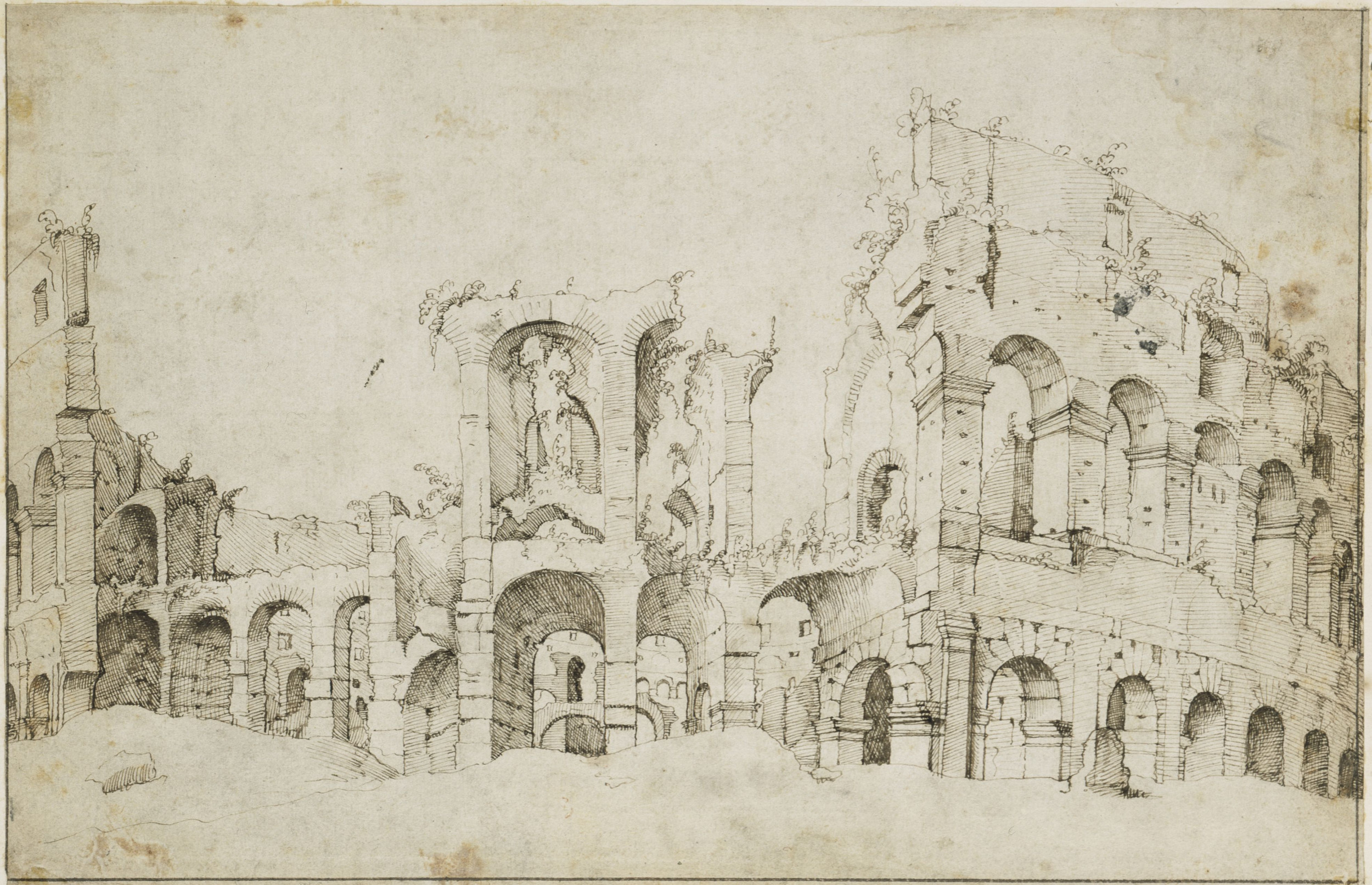
Rome, the Colosseum, by Maarten van Heemskerck

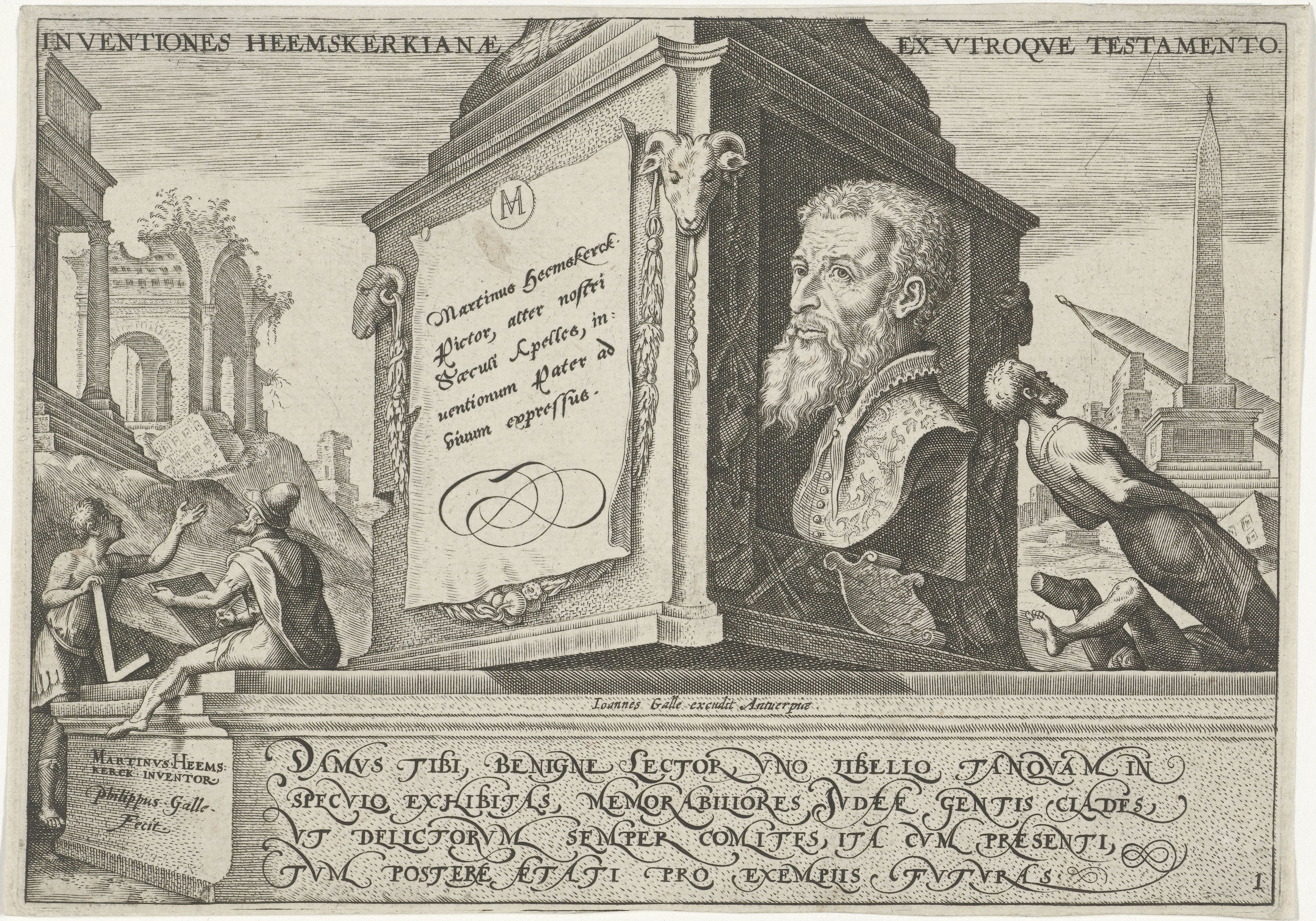
Inventiones Heemskerkianiae Ex Utroque Testamento, by Galle, 1569

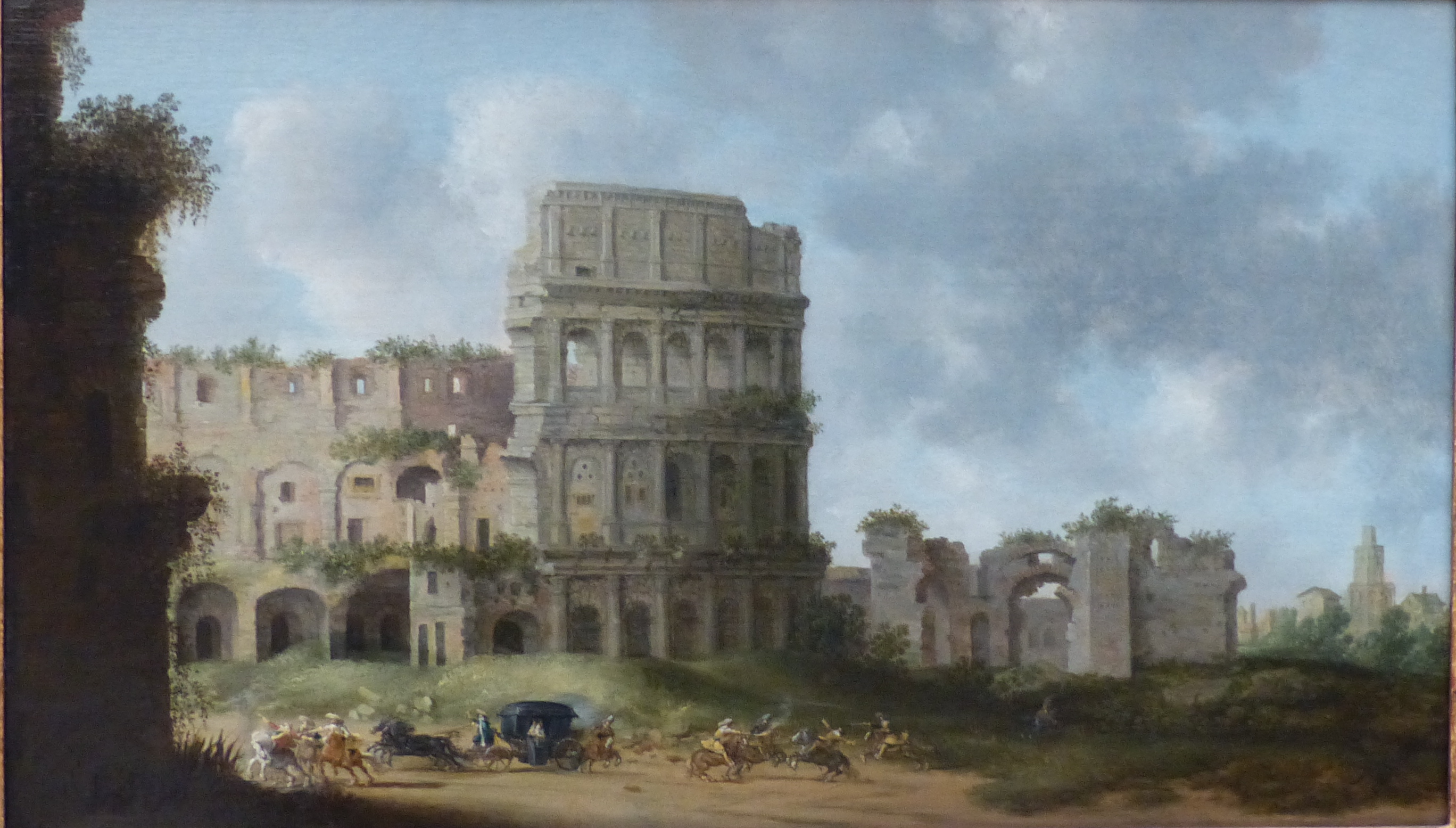
Colosseum by Saenredam, 1631
