= Cornelis Musius =

Dutch Roman Catholic priest (1500–1572)

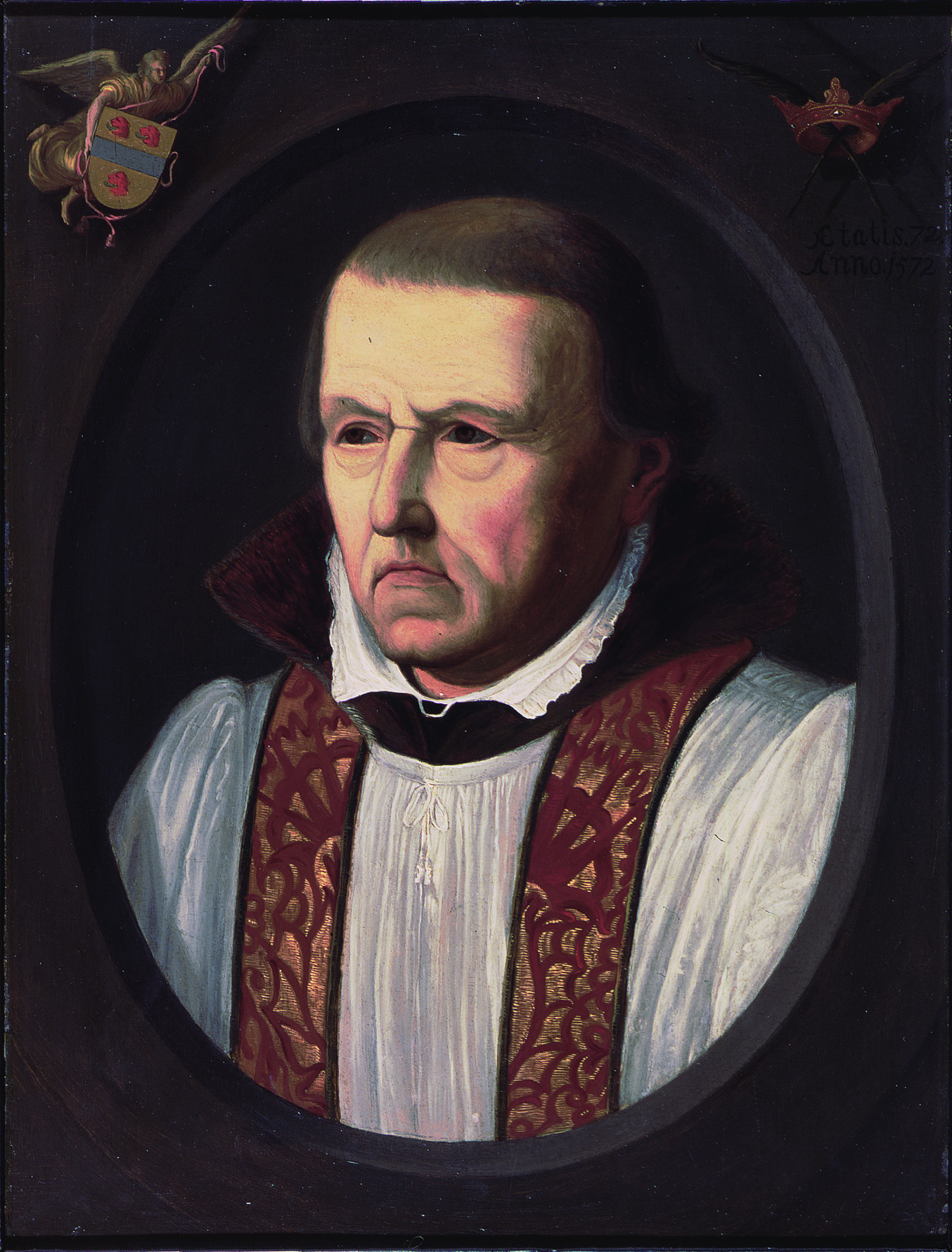
- Anonymous portrait of Cornelis Musius from 1572, Museum Het Prinsenhof, Delft.
- Born: Cornelis Muys; 11 June 1500; Delft, County of Holland, Habsburg Netherlands
- Hometown: Delft
- Died: 10/11 December 1572; Leiden, County of Holland, Dutch Republic
- Venerated in: Netherlands

Cornelis Musius (Dutch: Cornelis Muys; 1500–1572) was a Dutch Catholic priest and Neo-Latin poet. He was the last rector of the Sint Agathaklooster in Delft, until hanged without due process on 10 or 11 December 1572. Although never officially canonised, he has long been regarded as a martyr by Dutch Catholics.

== Life ==
Musius is thought to have been born in Delft on 11 June 1500 (although the sources are not unanimous, some giving alternative dates or locations). He was the son of Johannes Pietersz Muys, a descendant of the Dordrecht patrician lineage of Muys van Holy, and Elisabeth Woudana. He was orphaned young and began a clerical career. He studied theology at Leuven University, and travelled in Flanders and France, spending time in Ghent, Arras, Paris and Poitiers. He then became rector of the Sint Agathaklooster in Delft, a post he held for 35 years, while writing Latin verse and corresponding with numerous scholars he had met on his travels. He commissioned paintings for the convent from Maarten van Heemskerck, a close personal friend.

After the rebel takeover of Delft in 1572, Musius remained in place, a well-regarded intellectual. On contravening a curfew for members of the Catholic clergy and religious orders, leaving the city to bring church treasures to safety, he was hunted down by the Lord of Lumey and transported to Leiden. There, despite having a letter of safeguard from William of Orange, he was beaten, tortured and hanged.

His sufferings were described in Richard Verstegan's Theatrum Crudelitatum (Antwerp, 1587) and in book 10 of Petrus Opmeer's Historia martyrum Batavicorum (Cologne, 1625).

== Works ==
- Institutio foeminae christianae ex ultimo capite Proverbiorum Salomonis (1536)
- Solitudo sive Vita Solitaria laudata (Antwerp, Christopher Plantin, 1566). Available on Google Books.
