= Saint Luke Painting the Virgin (Heemskerck) =

1532 painting by Maarten van Heemskerck

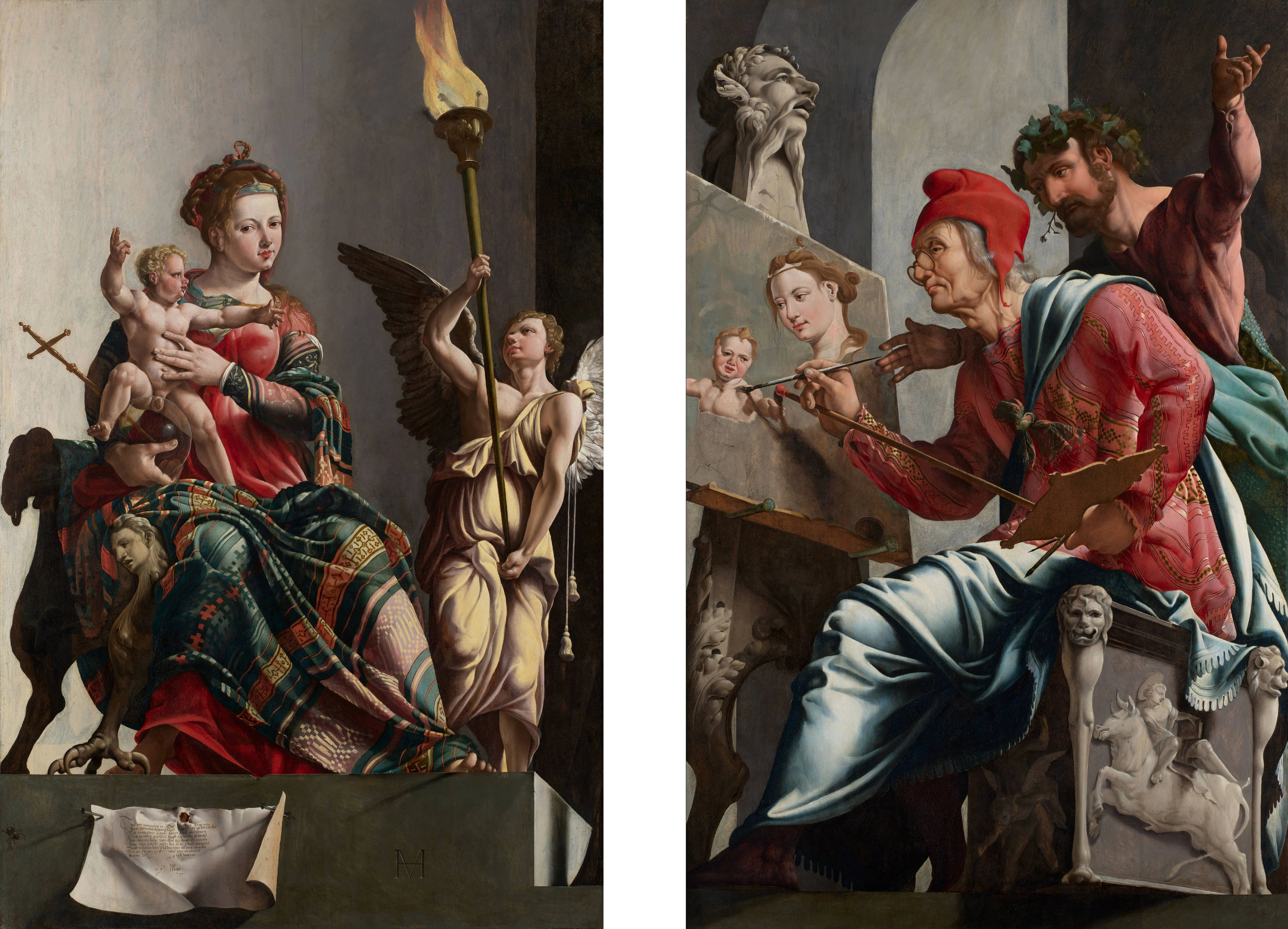
- Artist: Maarten van Heemskerck
- Year: 1532
- Type: Diptych
- Medium: Oil on panel
- Subject: Saint Luke painting the Virgin
- Dimensions: 192 cm × 259 cm (76 in × 102 in)
- Location: Frans Hals Museum, Haarlem

Saint Luke Painting the Virgin is 1532 oil-on-panel diptych by the Dutch Golden Age artist Maarten van Heemskerck. It is in the collection of the Frans Hals Museum in Haarlem, Netherlands.

== History and description ==
The left panel depicts Mary on a throne holding the Christ Child upon a transparent orb and cross. Mary has a multicolored Oriental cloth draped over her knees and is illuminated by an angel with a burning torch. The right panel shows Luke the Evangelist painting the Virgin and Child. According to Karel van Mander, Luke is dressed as a baker. A man stands over the painter's shoulder, guiding his hand. The man is a self-portrait of van Heemskerck and symbolizes inspiration, showing that art is an intellectual pursuit, not just handiwork.

The work is an example of a fairly common 16th- and 17th-century genre in European painting referred to as a Lukas-Madonna in Dutch. Van Heemskerck completed the panels just before his trip to Rome in 1532 and gifted them to the Haarlem Guild of St. Luke. The work hung at the guild's chapel in Grote Kerk, Haarlem. It is painted with exaggerated perspective which would have appeared naturalistic high up on the church wall.

Shortly after van Heemskerck's death in 1574, the two panels were joined together with a middle piece to form a single painting. During examination in 2020, this fact was discovered and the painting was restored to its original two panel format over the next four years.

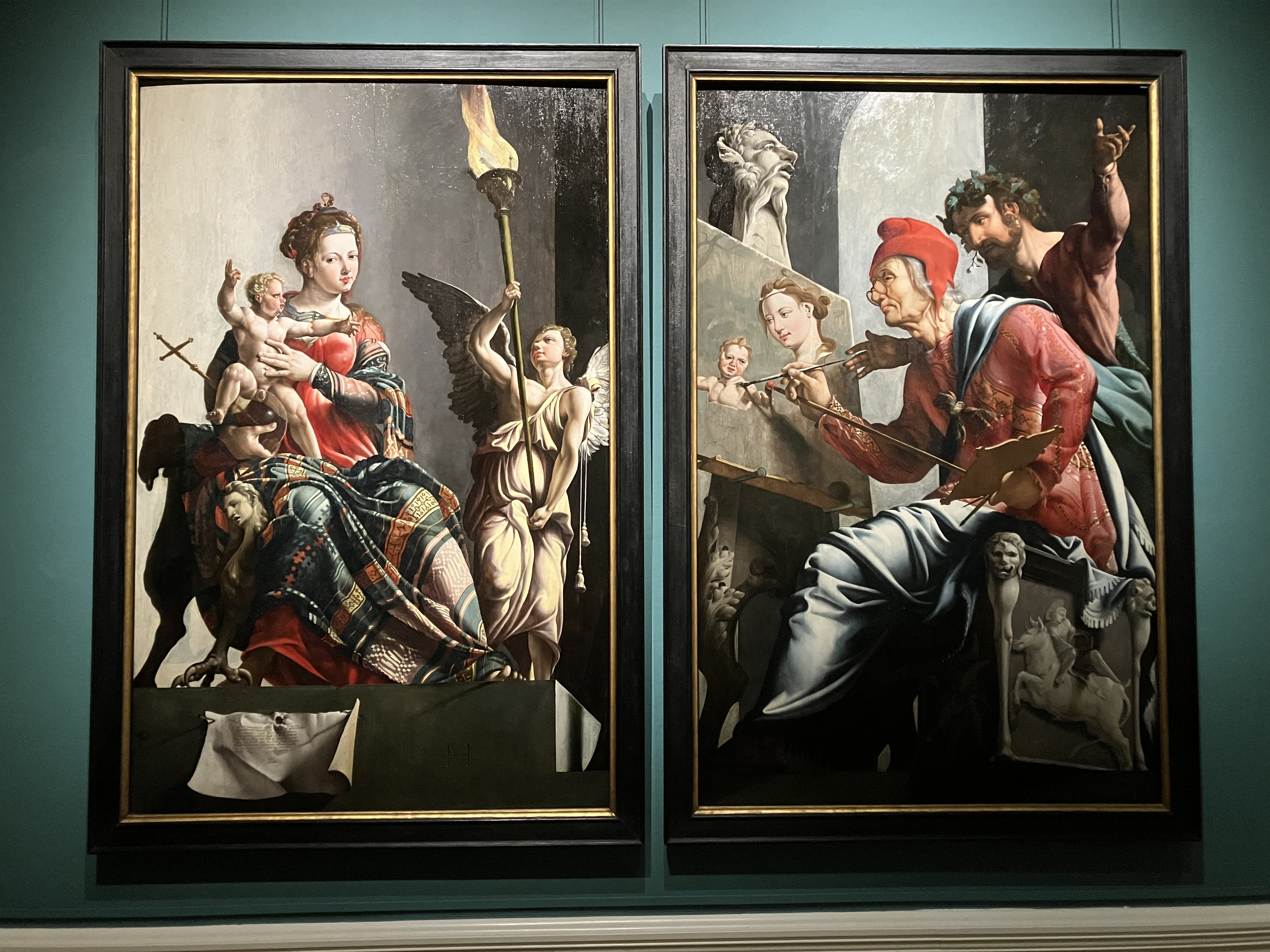
With frame

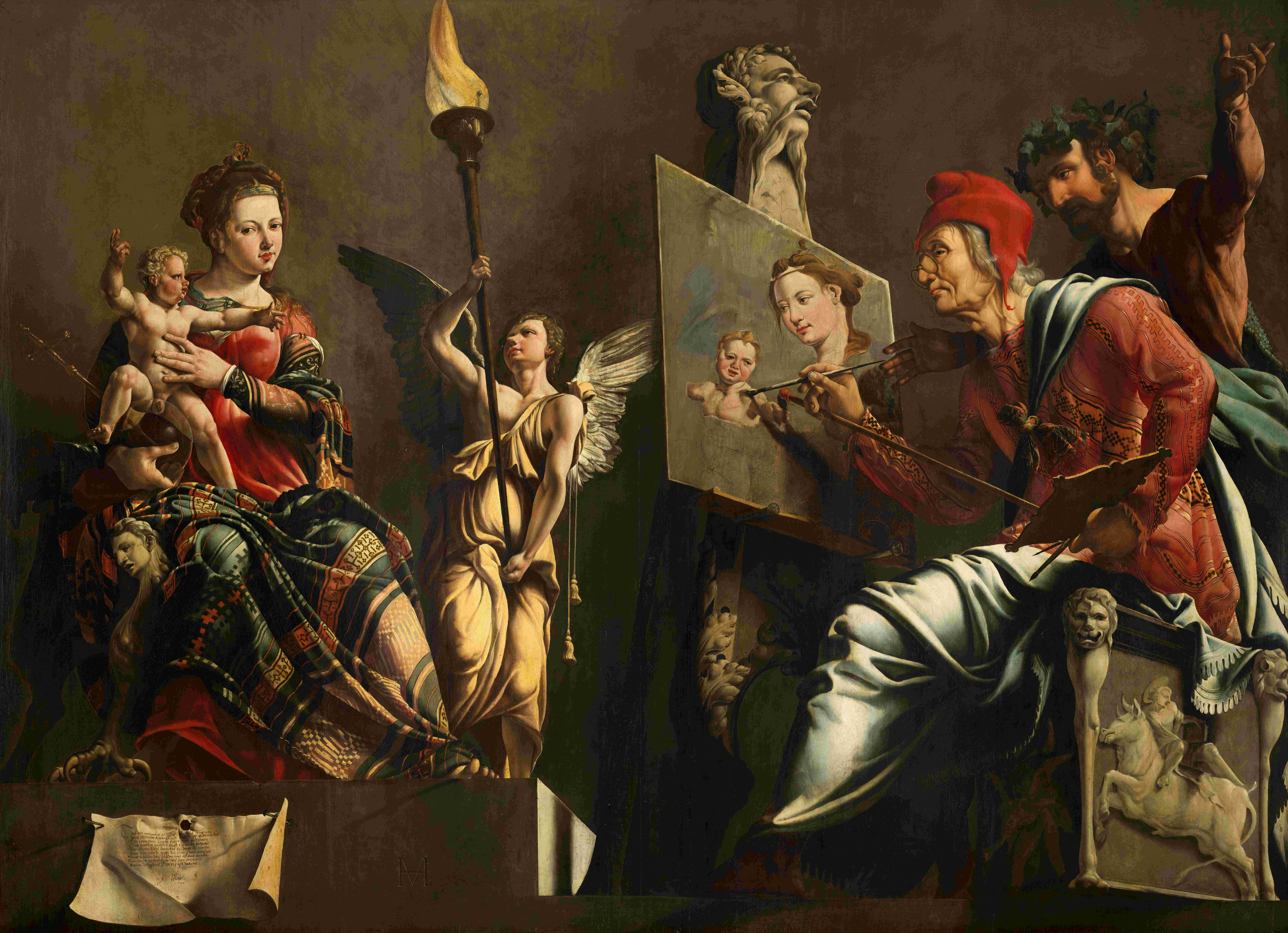
Prior to restoration

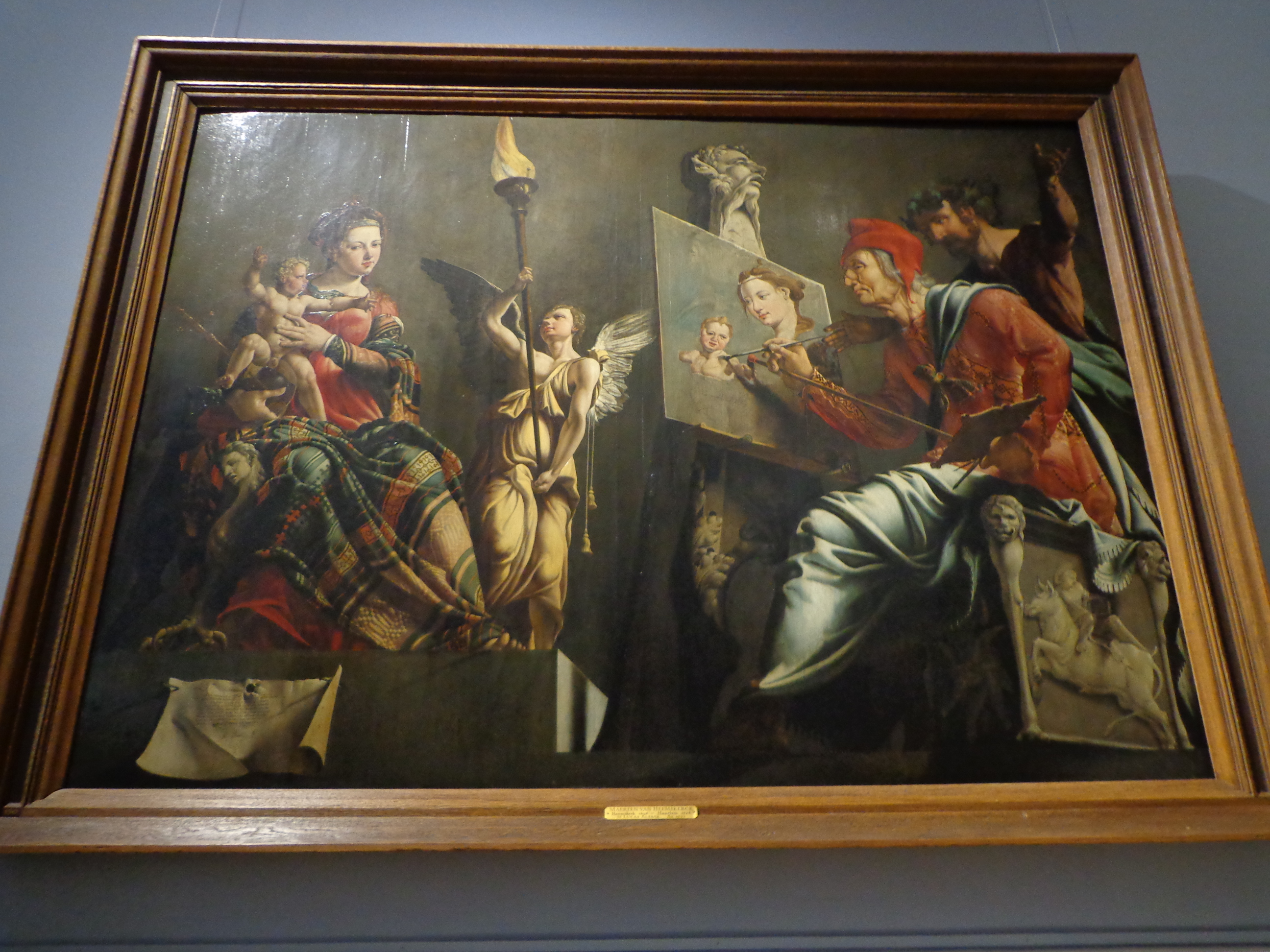
Seen from a low angle as intended (prior to restoration)

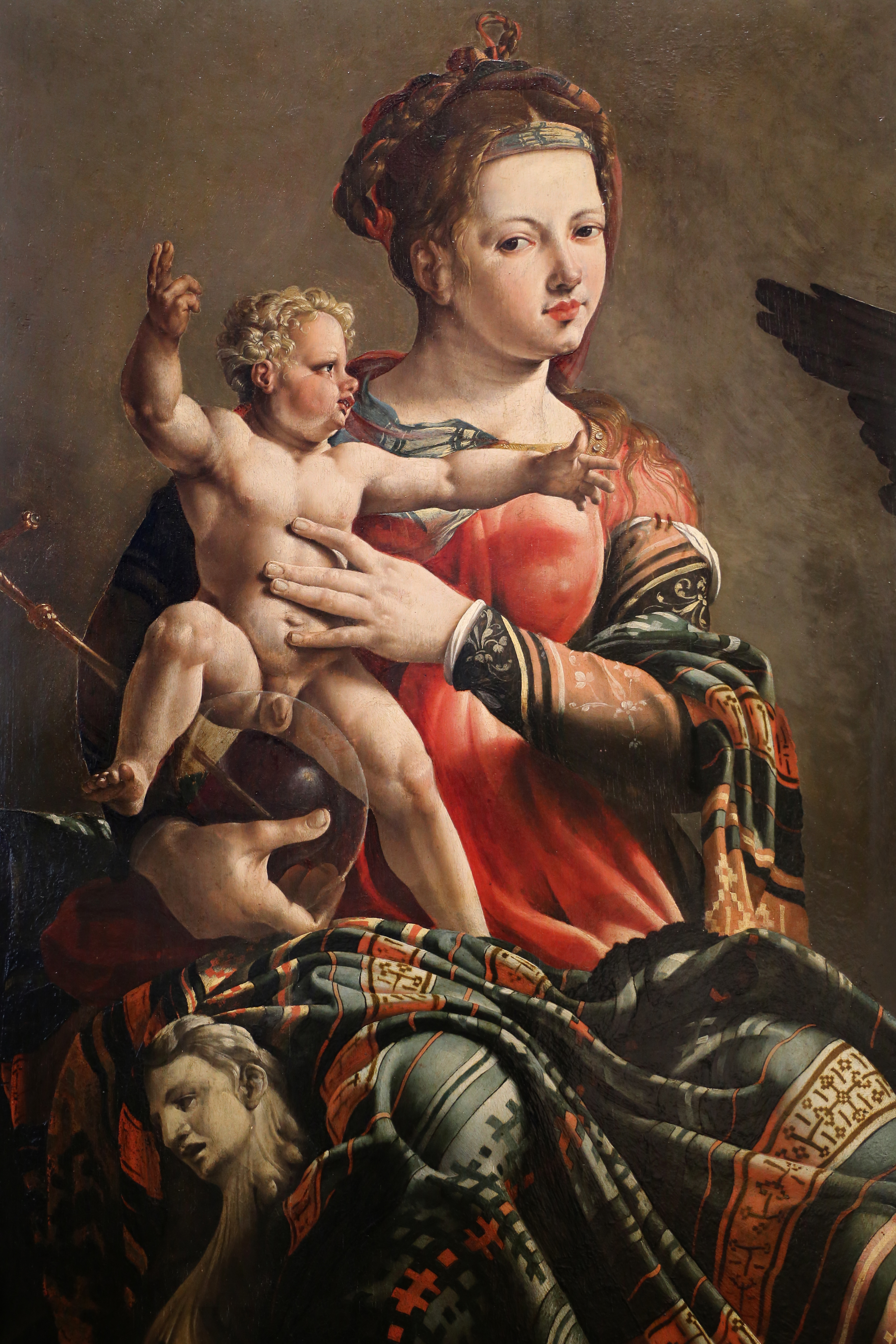
Detail of the Madonna

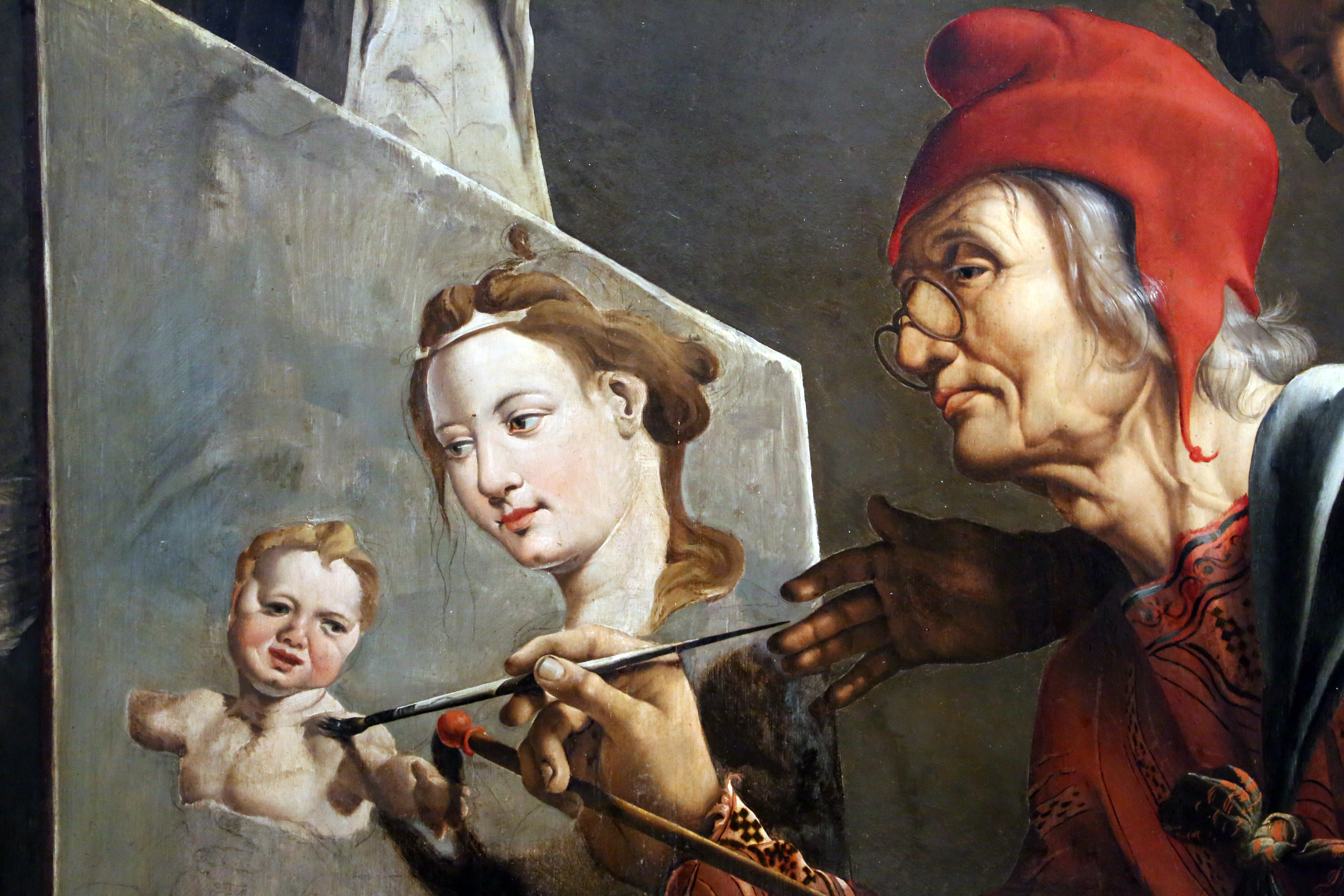
Detail of St. Luke

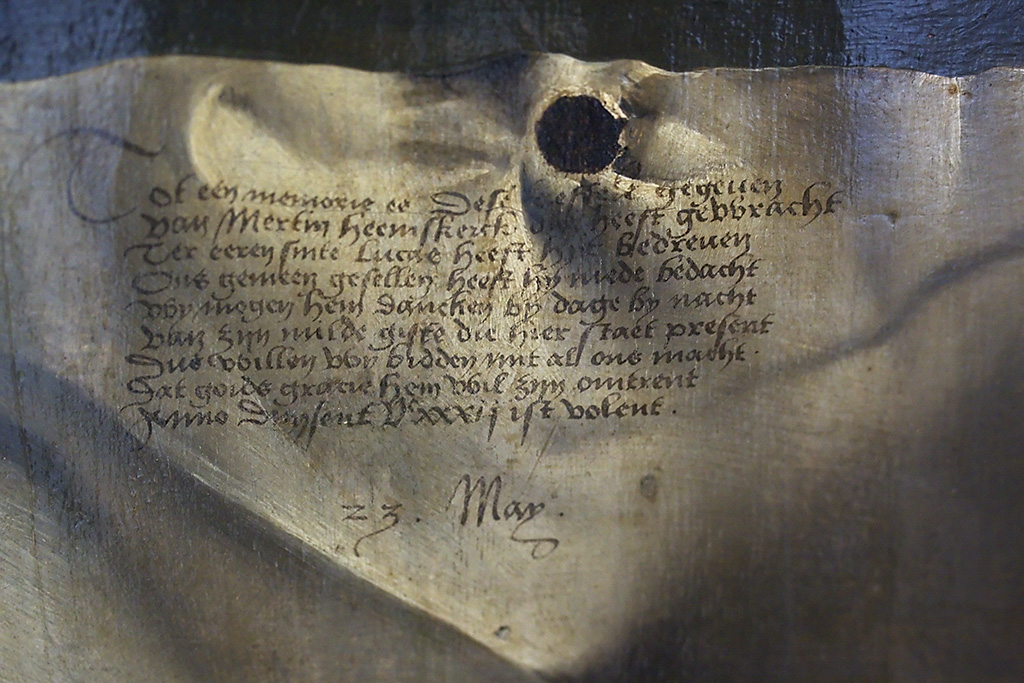
Detail of the written "paper" lower left
