= Maarten van Heemskerck =

Dutch painter (1498–1574)

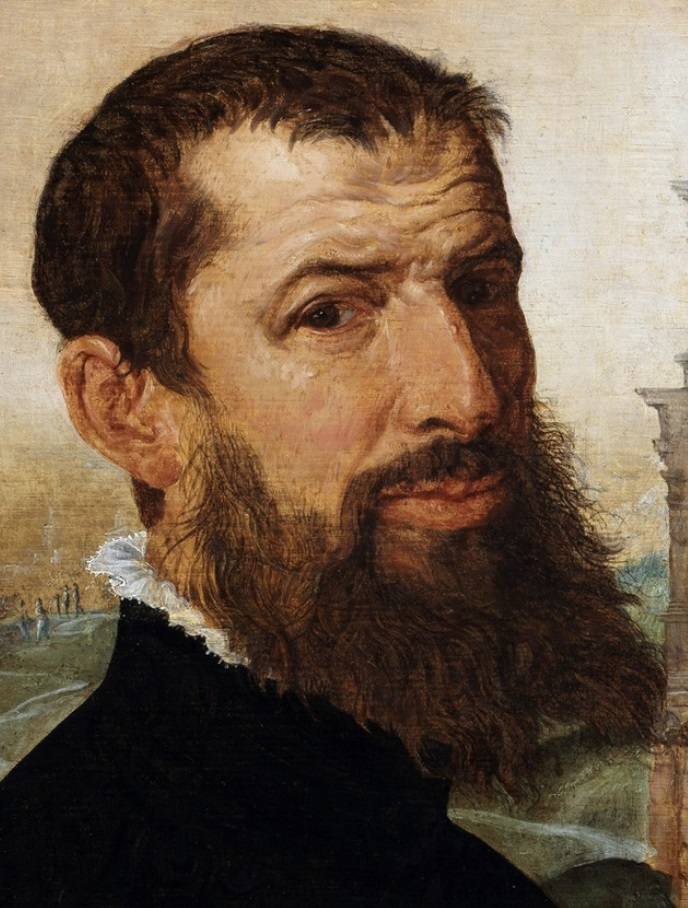
- Self-portrait detail from his painting of the Colosseum
- Born: Maerten Jacobsz van Veen; 1 June 1498; Heemskerk, Habsburg Netherlands
- Died: 1 October 1574 (aged 76); Haarlem, Spanish Netherlands
- Occupation: Painter
- Movement: Mannerism
- Patrons: Cornelis Muys, Haarlem council, Delft council

Maarten van Heemskerck (born Maerten Jacobsz van Veen; 1 June 1498 – 1 October 1574), also known as Marten Jacobsz Heemskerk van Veen, was a Dutch portrait and religious painter, who spent most of his career in Haarlem. He was a pupil of Jan van Scorel, and adopted his teacher's Italian-influenced style. He spent the years 1532–1536 in Italy. He produced many designs for engravers, and is especially known for his depictions of the Wonders of the World.

== Biography ==
=== Early life ===
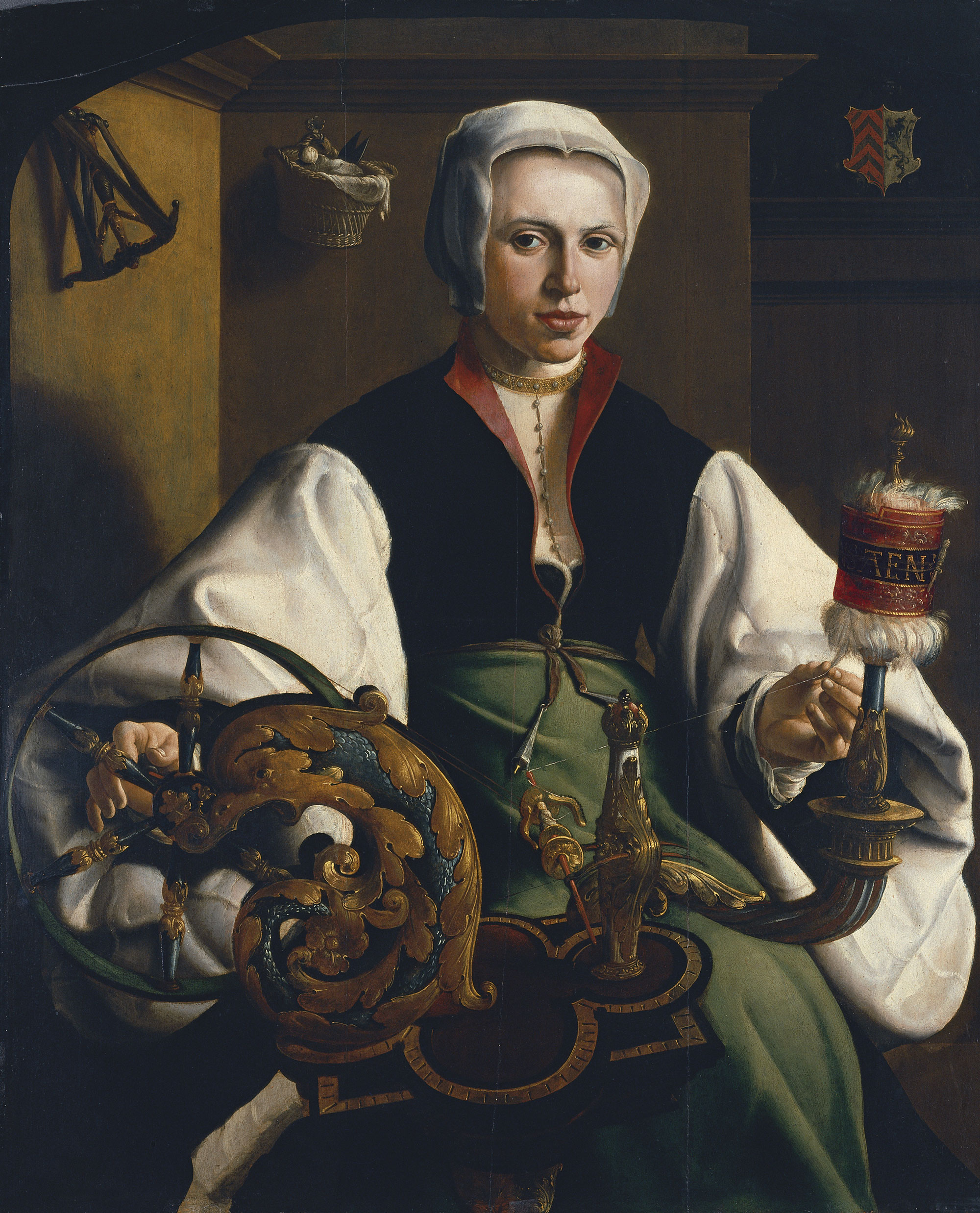
Portrait of a Lady spinning, Thyssen-Bornemisza Museum, Madrid; painted before Heemskerck left for Italy in 1532

Heemskerck was born in the village of Heemskerk, North Holland, halfway between Alkmaar and Haarlem. He was the son of a farmer called Jacob Willemsz. van Veen, later buried in the village churchyard. According to his biography by Karel van Mander, he began his artistic training with the painter Cornelius Willemsz in Haarlem, but was recalled to Heemskerk by his father to work on the family farm. However, having contrived an argument with his father he left again, this time for Delft, where he studied under Jan Lucasz, before moving on to Haarlem, where he became a pupil of Jan van Scorel, learning to paint in his teacher's innovative Italian-influenced style.

Heemskerck then went to lodge at the home of the wealthy curate of the Sint-Bavokerk, Pieter Jan Foppesz (whose name van Mander writes as Pieter Ian Fopsen). They knew each other because Foppesz owned land in Heemskerk. The artist painted him in a now famous family portrait, considered the first of its kind in a long line of Dutch family paintings. His other works for Foppesz included two life size figures symbolising the Sun and the Moon on a bedstead, and a picture of Adam and Eve "rather smaller but (it is said) after living models". His next home was in the house of a goldsmith, Justus Cornelisz, on the edge of Haarlem.

Before setting off for Italy on a Grand Tour in 1532, Heemskerck painted a scene of St. Luke painting the Virgin for the altar of St. Luke in the Bavokerk. An inscription, incorporated into a trompe-l'œil label on the painting begins "This picture is a remembrance from its painter, Marten Heemskerck; he has here dedicated his labours to St Luke as a proof of regard to his associates in his profession, of which that saint is patron".

=== Italy ===
He travelled around the whole of northern and central Italy, stopping at Rome, where he had letters of introduction from van Scorel to the influential Dutch cardinal William of Enckenvoirt.

It is evident of the facility with which he acquired the rapid execution of a scene-painter that he was selected to collaborate with Antonio da Sangallo the Younger, Battista Franco and Francesco de' Rossi (Il Salviati) on the redecoration of the Porta San Sebastiano at Rome as a triumphal arch (5 April 1536) in honour of Charles V. Giorgio Vasari, who saw the battle-pieces which Heemskerk then produced, said they were well composed and boldly executed.

While in Rome where he made numerous drawings of classical sculpture and architecture, many of which survive in two sketchbooks now in the Kupferstichkabinett Berlin. He was to use them as source material throughout the rest of his career. Among these are the Capitoline Brutus, van Heemskerck being the first known artist to make a sketch of this now famous bust.

A hypothesis put forward in 2021 and explained in 2024 stating that the drawings in the two Berlin scrapbooks were not executed by Maarten van Heemskerck and the Anonimi A and B, but with a few exceptions entirely by the sculptor Cornelis Floris II and dated between 1535/36 and 1538, was not taken up by archaeological and art-historical research and was refuted by several contributions to the Berlin exhibition catalog “The Allure of Rome. Maarten van Heemskerck draws the city."

Not only the provenance history of the Roman sketchbook, but above all stylistic and handwritten comparisons confirm Van Heemskerck's authorship. In addition, Van Heemskerck often reused Roman motifs from his drawings in later works, which would not have been possible if Cornelis Floris, who worked in Antwerp, had been the author. The results of the art technological examination of 2024 also contradict the hypothesis, as the ink of the drawings in the Roman sketchbook has the same composition as the undoubtedly autograph sheets of larger format, some of which are signed and dated.

=== Later career ===
On his return to the Netherlands in 1536, he settled back at Haarlem, where he became president of the Haarlem Guild of Saint Luke (in 1540), married twice (his first wife and child died during childbirth), and secured a large and lucrative practice.

The alteration in his style, brought about by his experience of Italy was not universally admired. According to van Mander, "in the opinion of some of the best judges he had not improved it, except in one particular, that his outline was more graceful than before".

He painted large altarpieces for his friend, the art maecenas and later Catholic martyr of the Protestant Reformation, Cornelis Muys (also known as Musius). Muys had returned from a period in France to the Netherlands in 1538 and became prior of the St. Agatha cloister in Delft (later became the Prinsenhof). This lucrative and high-profile work in Delft earned Heemskerck a commission for an altarpiece in the Nieuwe Kerk (Delft) for their Guild of St. Luke. In 1553 he became curate of the Sint-Bavokerk, where he served for 22 years (until the Protestant Reformation). In 1572 he left Haarlem for Amsterdam, to avoid the siege of Haarlem which the Spaniards laid to the place.

== Engravings ==
He was one of the first Netherlandish artists to make drawings specifically for reproduction by commercial printmakers. He employed a technique incorporating cross-hatching and stippling, intended to aid the engraver.

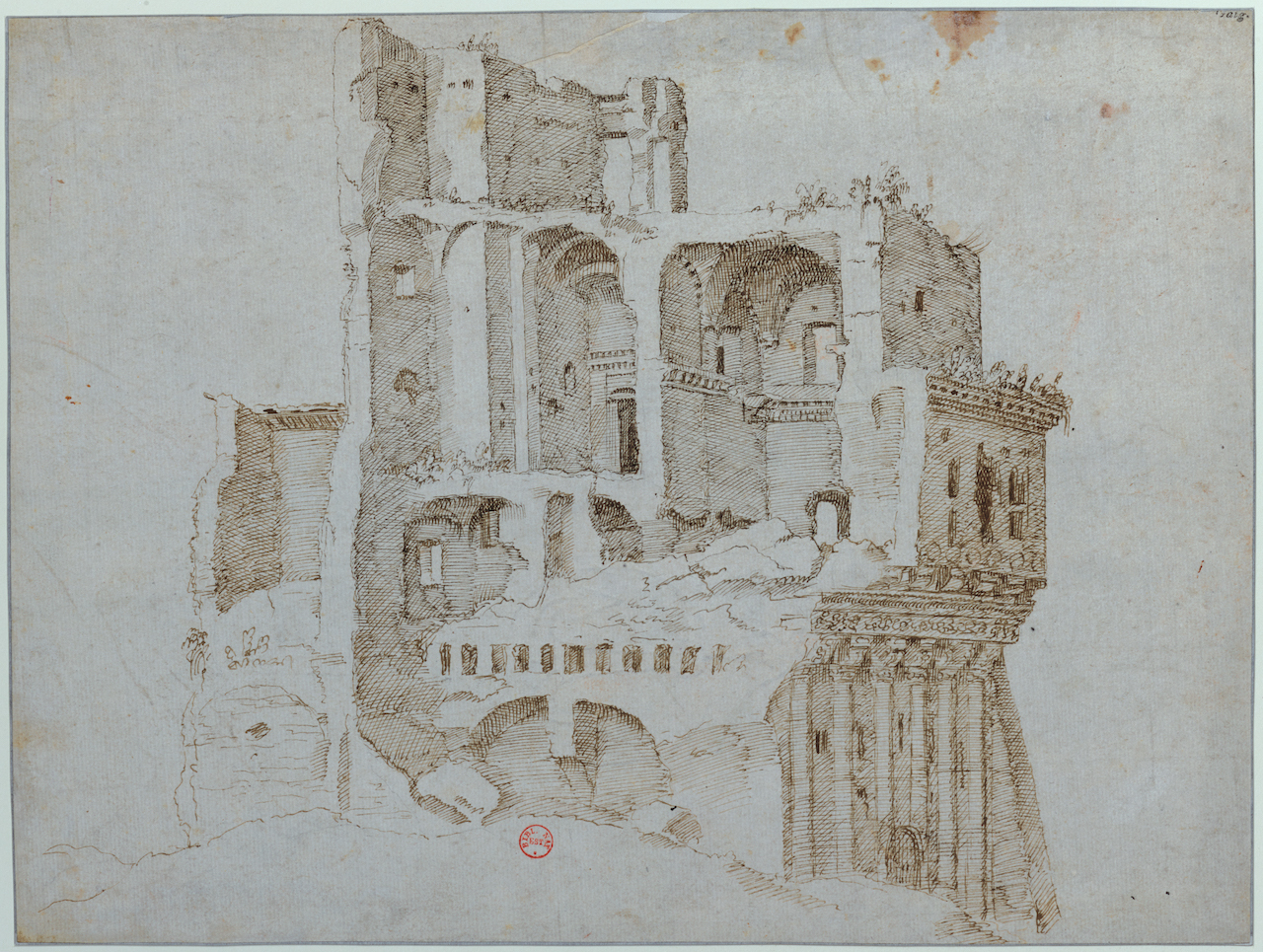
Maarten van Heemskerck, "Les ruines de la Casa dei Crescenzi"

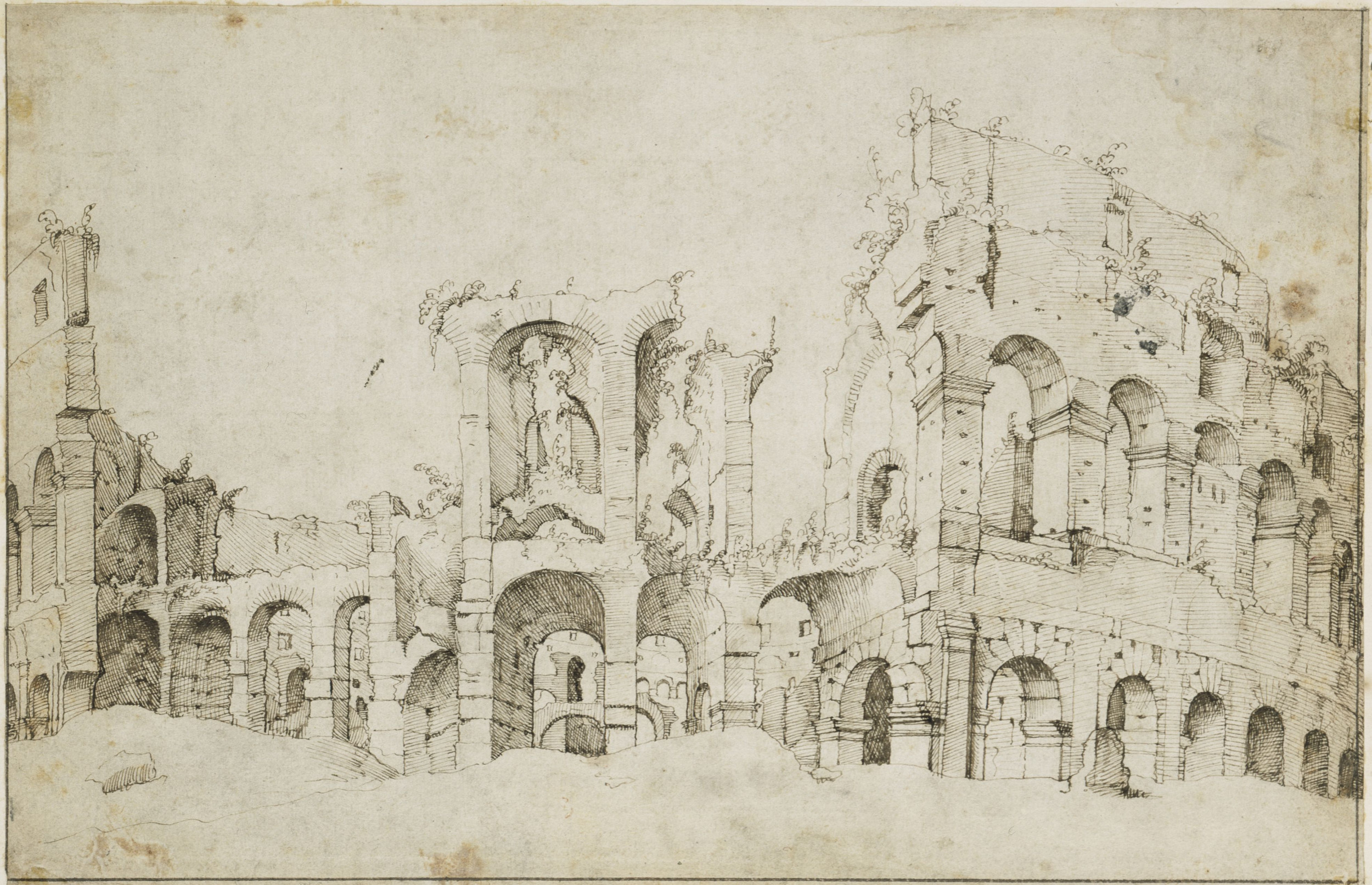
Maarten van Heemskerck, "Rome, the Colosseum"

=== Wonders of the World ===
Heemskerck produced designs for a set of engravings, showing eight, rather than the usual seven wonders of the ancient world. His addition to the conventional list was the Colosseum in Rome, which, unlike the others, he showed in ruins, as it was in his own time, with the speculative addition of a giant statue of Jupiter in the centre. They were engraved by Philip Galle and published in 1572.

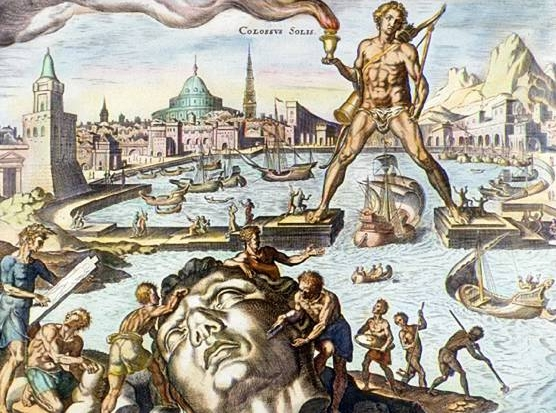
Colossus of Rhodes, imagined in a 16th-century engraving by Martin Heemskerck

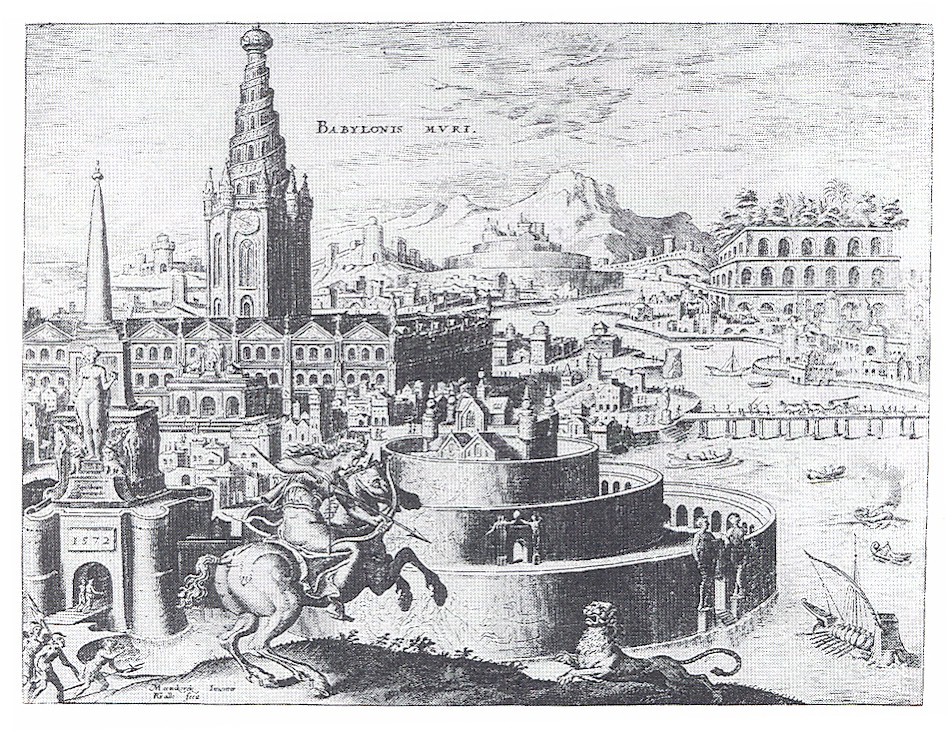
Hanging Gardens of Babylon, said to be the oldest-known imaginary reconstruction from historical descriptions

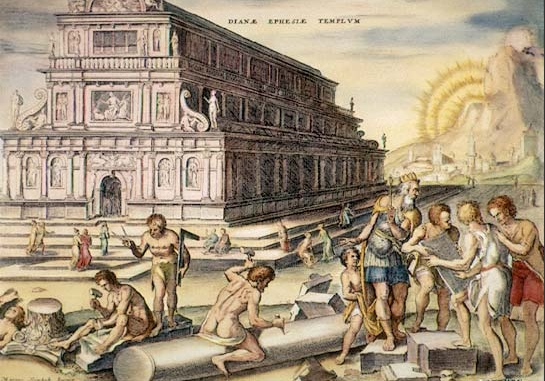
The Temple of Artemis, has the "old-fashioned" look of Santa Maria Novella in Florence and other Italian quattrocento churches of the mannerist generation.

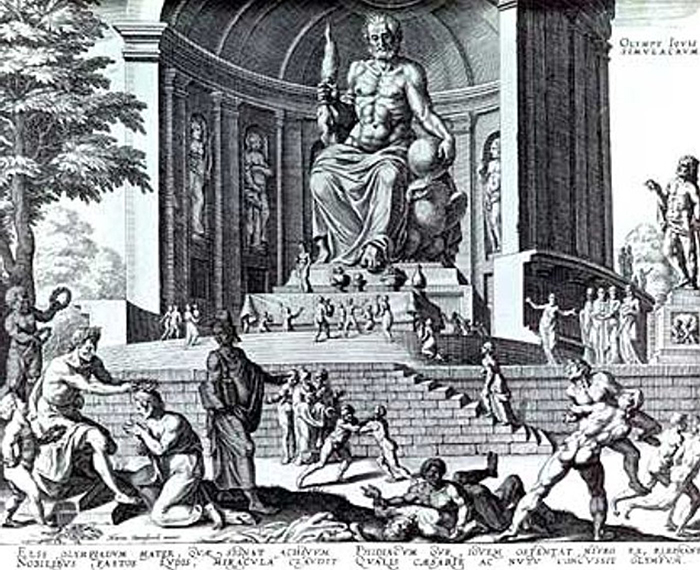
A fanciful reconstruction of Phidias' Statue of Zeus at Olympia, engraving by Philip Galle in 1572, from a drawing by Heemskerck

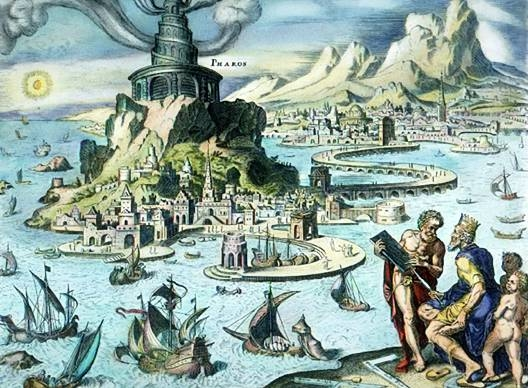
A fanciful 16th-century interpretation of the Pharos, or Lighthouse of Alexandria

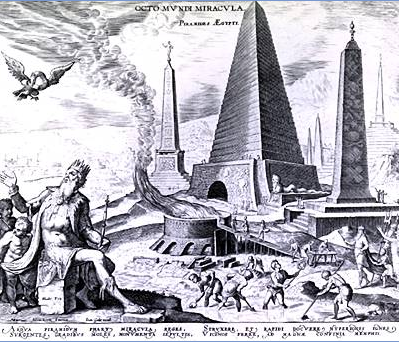
The Great Pyramid of Giza (Bettman collection)

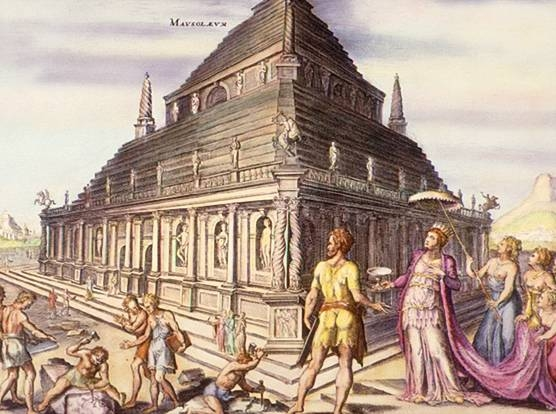
Fanciful interpretation of the Mausoleum of Halicarnassus, 1572

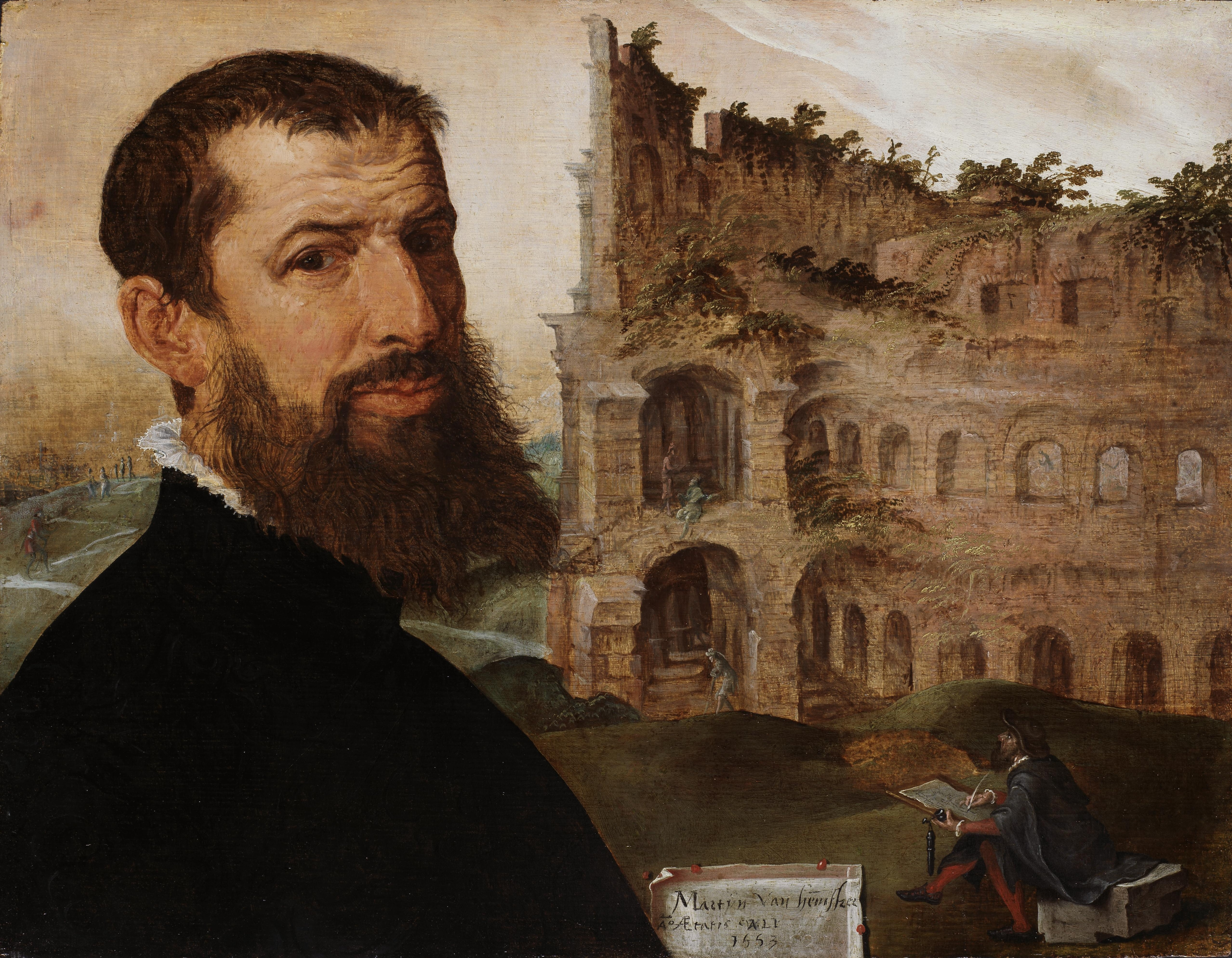
He painted his self-portrait with the Colosseum.

== Paintings ==
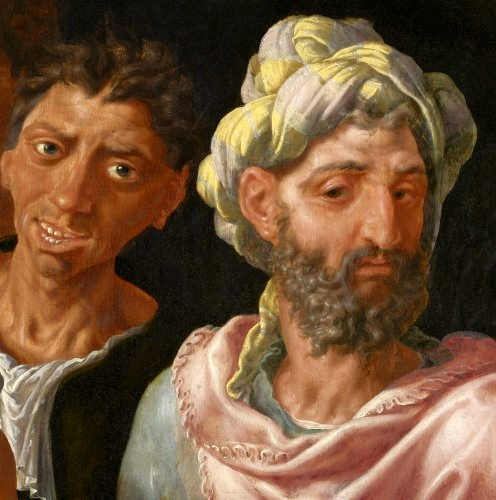
Detail of Ecce Homo Altarpiece (1544), National Museum, Warsaw. Exaggerated expressions and robust musculature created with relatively little paint are prime characteristics of Heemskerck's style.

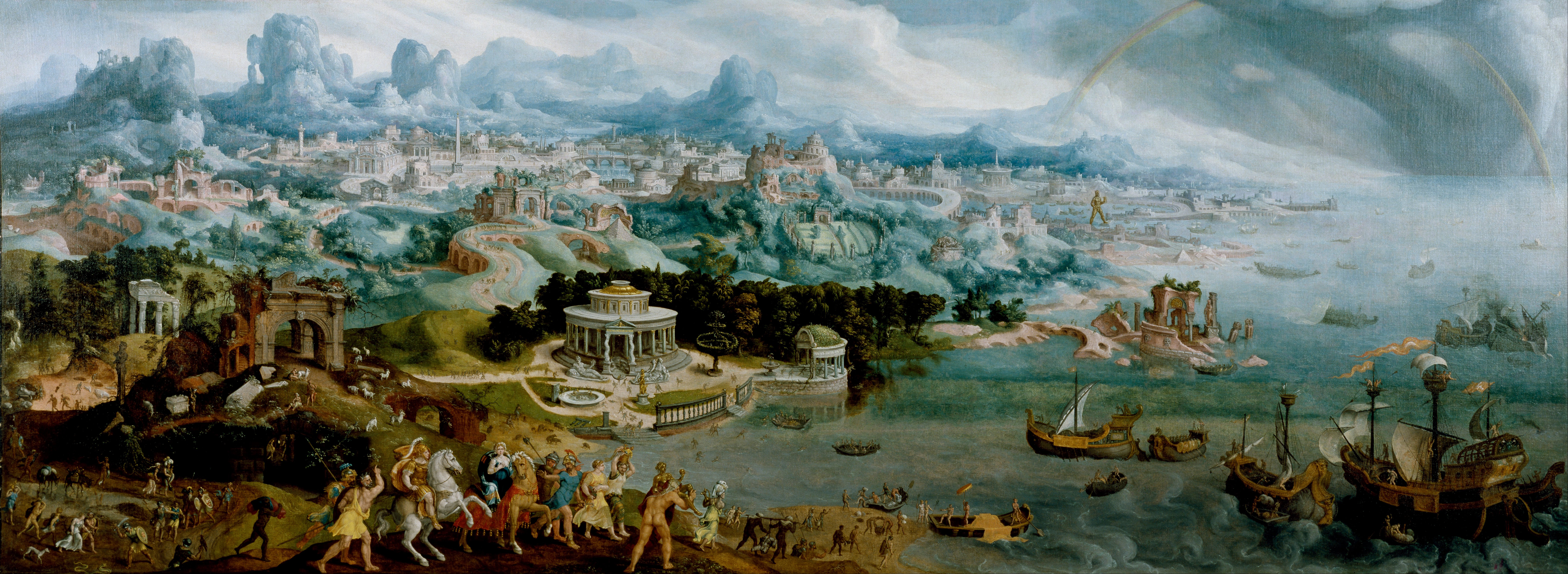
Painting by van Heemskerck depicting the abduction of Helen, queen of the Greek city-state Sparta, by Paris. The Walters Art Museum

Many works by van Heemskerck survive. Adam and Eve and St. Luke painting the Likeness of the Virgin and Child in presence of a poet crowned with ivy leaves, and a parrot in a cage – an altar-piece in the gallery of Haarlem, and the Ecce Homo in the Museum of Fine Arts in Ghent, are characteristic works of the period preceding van Heemskerck's visit to Italy. An altar-piece executed for the St. Laurence Church of Alkmaar in 1539–1543, composed of at least a dozen large panels, which including portraits of historical figures, preserved in Linköping Cathedral, Sweden since the Reformation, shows his style after his return from Italy.

He painted a crucifixion for the Riches Claires at Ghent (now in the Museum of Fine Arts, Ghent) in 1543, and an altar-piece for the Drapers' Company at Haarlem, finished in 1546 and now in the gallery of the Hague. They show how Heemskerck studied and repeated the forms which he had seen in the works of Michelangelo and Raphael at Rome, and in the frescoes of Andrea Mantegna and Giulio Romano in Lombardy, but he never forgot his Dutch origin or the models first presented to him by Scorel and Jan Mabuse.

In 1550, Heemskerck painted a large, now dismembered triptych, the remains of which are today divided between the Musée des Beaux-Arts de Strasbourg (Adam and Eve/Gideon and the Fleece), and the Museum Boijmans Van Beuningen (The Visitation). As late as 1551, he then produced a copy from Raphael's Madonna of Loreto (Frans Hals Museum). In 1552, he painted a view of a bull race inside the Colosseum of Rome (Palais des Beaux-Arts de Lille). A Judgment of Momus, dated 1561, in the Gemäldegalerie, Berlin, shows that he was well acquainted with anatomy and fond of florid architecture. Two altar-pieces which he finished for churches at Delft in 1551 and 1559, one complete (St. Luke painting the Virgin), the other a fragment, in the museum of Haarlem, a third of 1551 in the Brussels Museum, representing Golgotha, the Crucifixion, the Flight into Egypt, Christ on the Mount, and scenes from the lives of St. Bernard and St. Benedict, are all fairly representative of his style.

There is a Crucifixion in the Hermitage Museum of Saint Petersburg, and two Triumphs of Silenus in the gallery of Vienna. Other pieces of varying importance are in the galleries of Rotterdam, Munich, Cassel, Brunswick, Karlsruhe, Mainz, Copenhagen, Strasbourg and Rennes.

=== Parrots ===
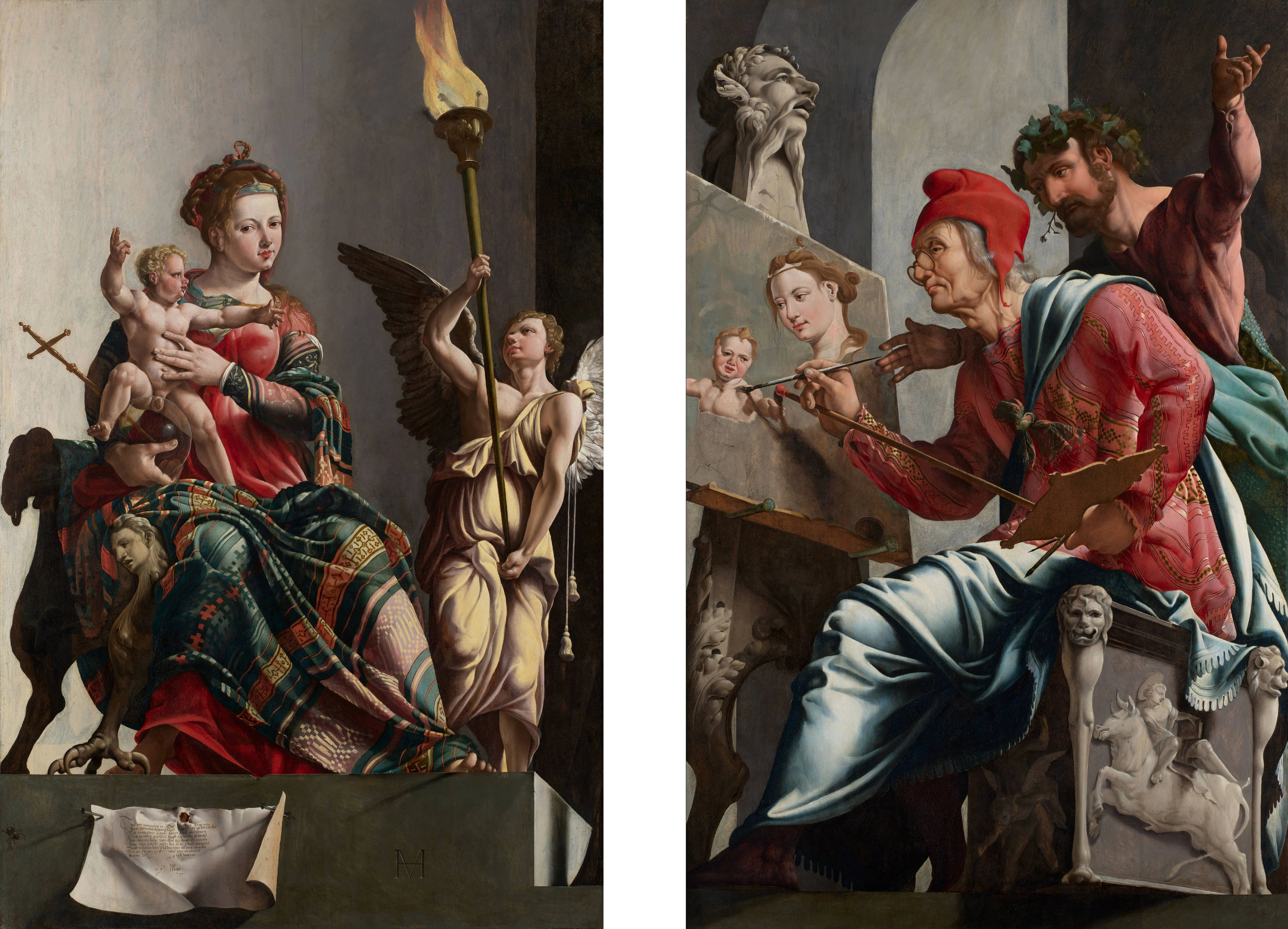
Heemskerck painted this diptych before he left Haarlem for Italy in 1532.

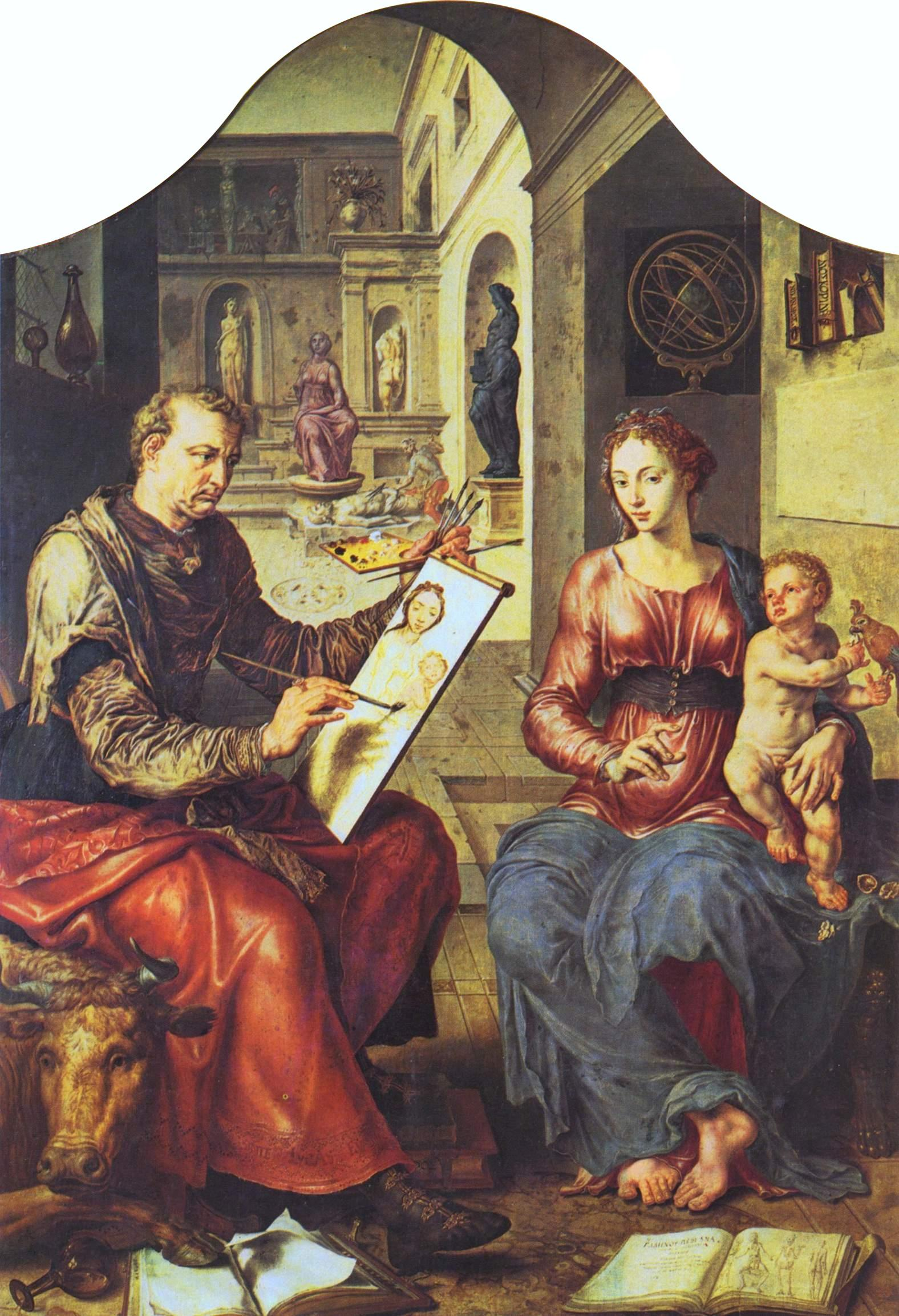
Heemskerck painted this second altarpiece after he returned from Italy in 1538-40 (Musée des Beaux-Arts, Rennes). In this painting, the parrot is held by the baby Jesus.

In his depiction of Saint Luke painting the Virgin, which Heemskerck painted twice for two painter's guilds, there is some confusion in the literature about a parrot. In both paintings he painted a parrot, but the parrot in a cage has been sawn off the first painting and is no longer visible.

== Death ==
In Amsterdam he made a will, which has been preserved. It shows that he had lived long enough and prosperously enough to make a fortune. At his death, he left money and land in trust to the orphanage of Haarlem, with interest to be paid yearly to any couple who should be willing to perform the marriage ceremony on the slab of his tomb in the cathedral of Haarlem. It was a superstition in Catholic Holland that a marriage so celebrated would secure the peace of the dead within the tomb.

== Reputation ==
Heemskerck was widely respected in his own lifetime and was a strong influence on the painters of Haarlem in particular. He is known (along with his teacher Jan van Scorel) for his introduction of Italian art to the Northern Netherlands, especially for his series on the wonders of the world, that were subsequently spread as prints. Karel van Mander devoted six pages to his biography in his Schilder-boeck.

== Public collections ==
- Courtauld Institute of Art
- Museum Boijmans Van Beuningen, Rotterdam
- Museum of New Zealand Te Papa Tongarewa
- National Gallery, London
- Rijksmuseum Amsterdam
- Musée des Beaux-Arts de Strasbourg
- University of Michigan Museum of Art
- Museo Municipal de Bellas Artes Juan B. Castagnino, Rosario

== Sources ==
- Kerrich, Thomas (1829). A Catalogue of the Prints which have been Engraved after Martin Heemskerck. London: J. Rodwell. Includes an English translation of van Mander's biography of Heemskerck.
