= Colosseum =

Ancient Roman amphitheater in Rome

- Looking east from the Piazza di Santa Francesca Romana, 2020

- Shown within Augustan Rome
- Click on the map for a fullscreen view
- 41°53′25″N 12°29′32″E
- Type: Amphitheatre
- Location: Regio III Isis et Serapis, Rome, Italy

History
- Built: AD 70–80; 1946 years ago
- Built by: Vespasian, Titus

The Colosseum (/ˌkɒləˈsiːəm/ KOL-ə-SEE-əm; Italian: Colosseo [kolosˈsɛːo]) is an elliptical amphitheatre in the centre of the city of Rome, Italy, just east of the Roman Forum. It is the largest ancient amphitheatre ever built, and is the largest standing amphitheatre in the world. Construction began under Emperor Vespasian (r. 69–79 AD) in 72 and was completed in AD 80 under his successor and heir, Titus (r. 79–81). Further modifications were made during the reign of Domitian (r. 81–96). The three emperors who were patrons of the work are known as the Flavian dynasty, and the amphitheatre was named the Flavian Amphitheatre (Latin: Amphitheatrum Flavium; Italian: Anfiteatro Flavio [aɱfiteˈaːtro ˈflaːvjo]) by later classicists and archaeologists for its association with their family name (Flavius).

The Colosseum is built of travertine, Roman concrete (foundations, corridors vaults and secondary brick walls), and tuff (volcanic rock). It could hold an estimated 50,000 to 80,000 spectators at various points in its history, having an average audience of some 65,000; it was used for gladiatorial contests and public spectacles including animal hunts, executions, re-enactments of famous battles, dramas based on Roman mythology, and briefly mock sea battles. The building ceased to be used for entertainment in the early medieval era. It was later reused for such purposes as housing, workshops, quarters for a religious order, a fortress, a quarry, and a Christian shrine.

Although substantially ruined by earthquakes and stone robbers taking spolia, the Colosseum is still a renowned symbol of Imperial Rome and was listed as one of the New 7 Wonders of the World. It is one of Rome's most popular tourist attractions and each Good Friday the pope leads a torchlit Catholic "Way of the Cross" procession that starts in the area around the Colosseum. The Colosseum is depicted on the Italian version of the 5 euro cent coin.

== Name ==
Originally, the building's Latin name was simply amphitheatrum, 'amphitheatre'. Though the modern name Flavian Amphitheatre (Latin: Amphitheatrum Flavium) is often used, there is no evidence it was used in classical antiquity. This name refers to the patronage of the Flavian dynasty, during whose reigns the building was constructed, but the structure is better known as the Colosseum. In antiquity, Romans may have referred to the Colosseum by the unofficial name Amphitheatrum Caesareum (with Caesareum an adjective pertaining to the title Caesar), but this name may have been strictly poetic as it was not exclusive to the Colosseum; Vespasian and Titus, builders of the Colosseum, also constructed a Flavian Amphitheatre in Puteoli (modern Pozzuoli).

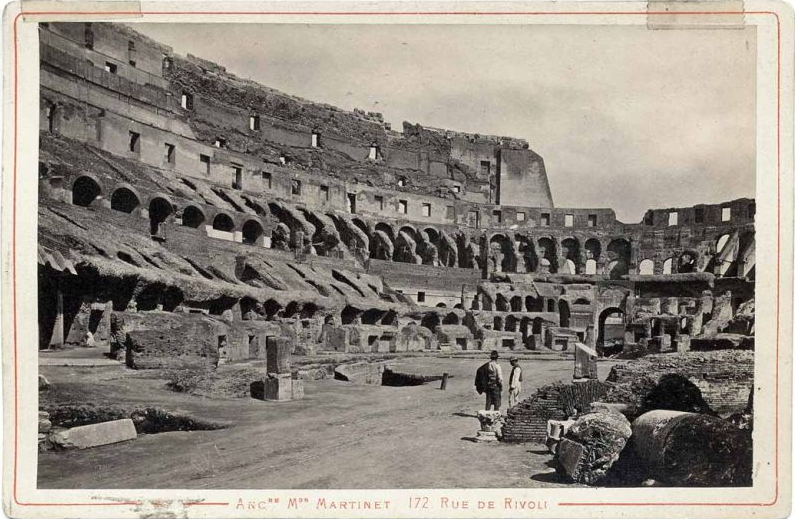
Interior of the Colosseum by late nineteenth century photographer Francis Frith

The name Colosseum is believed to be derived from a colossal statue of Nero on the model of the Colossus of Rhodes. The giant bronze sculpture of Nero as a solar deity was moved to its position beside the amphitheatre by the emperor Hadrian (r. 117–138). The word colosseum is a neuter Latin noun formed from the adjective colosseus, meaning "gigantic" or "colossean". By the year 1000 the Latin name "Colosseum" had been coined to refer to the amphitheatre from the nearby "Colossus Solis".

In the 8th century, an epigram attributed to the Venerable Bede celebrated the symbolic significance of the statue in a prophecy that is variously quoted: Quamdiu stat Colisæus, stat et Roma; quando cadet colisæus, cadet et Roma; quando cadet Roma, cadet et mundus ("as long as the Colossus stands, so shall Rome; when the Colossus falls, Rome shall fall; when Rome falls, so falls the world"). This is often mistranslated to refer to the Colosseum rather than the Colossus (as in, for instance, Byron's poem Childe Harold's Pilgrimage). However, at the time that the Pseudo-Bede wrote, the masculine noun coliseus was applied to the statue rather than to the amphitheatre.

The spelling was sometimes altered in Medieval Latin: coloseum and coliseum are attested from the 12th and 14th centuries respectively. In the 12th century, the structure was recorded as the amphitheatrum colisei, 'Amphitheatre of the Colossus'. In the High Middle Ages, the Flavian amphitheatre is attested as the late 13th-century Old French: colosé, and in Middle French as: colisée by the early 16th century, by which time the word could be applied to any amphitheatre. From Middle French: colisée derived the Middle English: colisee, in use by the middle of the 15th century and employed by John Capgrave in his Solace of Pilgrims, in which he remarked: Middle English: collise eke is a meruelous place … þe moost part of it stant at þis day. An English translation by John Bourchier, 2nd Baron Berners, of Antonio de Guevara's biography of Marcus Aurelius (r. 161–180) in about 1533 referred to Middle English: this Emperour, beynge with the Senate at Collisee .... Similarly, the Italian: colosseo, or coliseo, are attested as referring first to the amphitheatre in Rome, and then to any amphitheatre (as Italian: culiseo in 1367). By 1460, an equivalent existed in Catalan: coliseu; by 1495 had appeared the Spanish: coliseo, and by 1548 the Portuguese: coliseu.

The earliest citation for the name Colosseum in Early Modern English is the 1600 translation, by Philemon Holland, of the Urbis Romae topographia of Bartolomeo Marliani, which he used in the preparation of his translation of Livy's Augustan era Ab Urbe Condita Libri. The text states: "This Amphitheatre was commonly called Colosseum, of Neroes Colossus, which was set up in the porch of Neroes house." Similarly, John Evelyn, translating the Middle French name: le Colisée used by the architectural theorist Roland Fréart de Chambray, wrote "And 'tis indeed a kind of miracle to see that the Colosseum … and innumerable other Structures which seemed to have been built for Eternity, should be at present so ruinous and dilapidated".

== History ==
=== Construction, inauguration, and Roman renovations ===
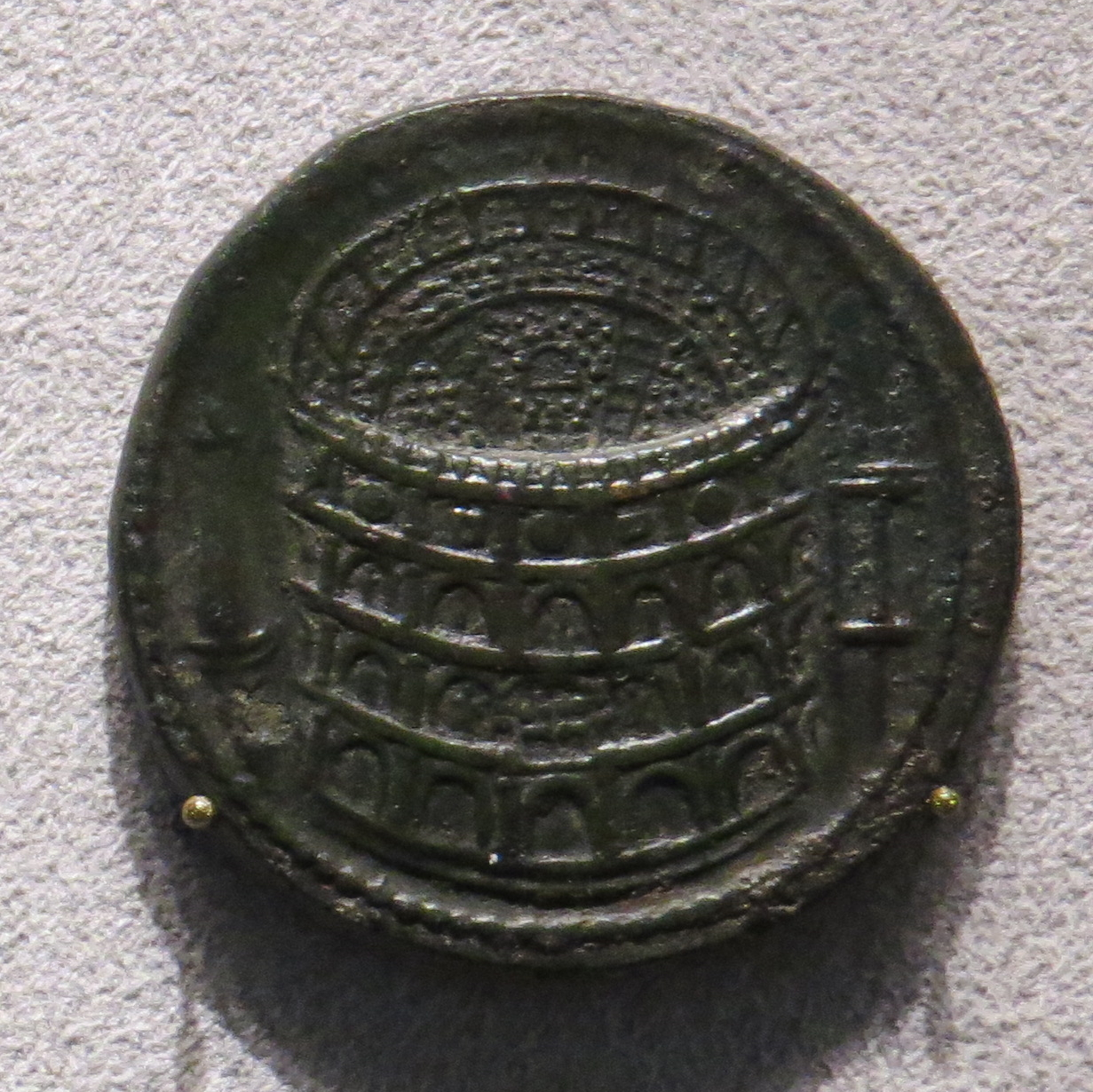
Sestertius of Titus celebrating the inauguration of the Colosseum (minted 80 AD).

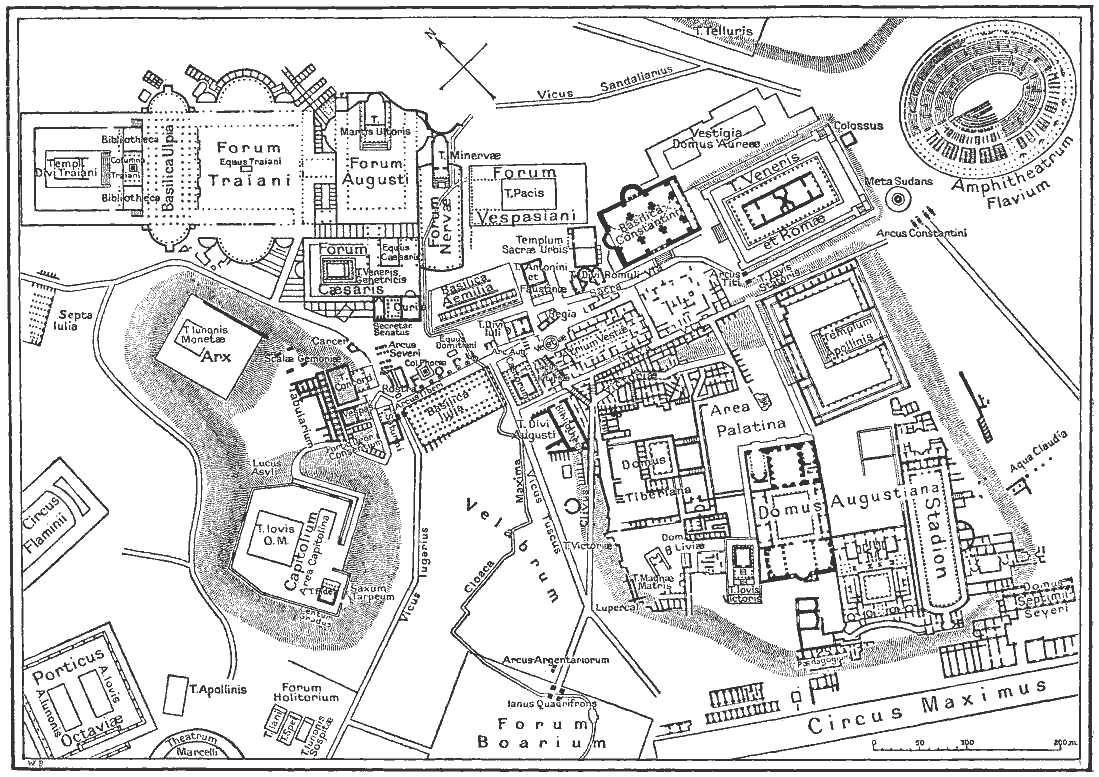
A map of central Rome during the Roman Empire, with the Colosseum at the upper right corner

The site chosen was a flat area on the floor of a low valley between the Caelian, Esquiline and Palatine Hills, through which a canalised stream ran as well as an artificial lake/marsh. By the 2nd century BC the area was densely inhabited. It was devastated by the Great Fire of Rome in 64 AD, following which Nero seized much of the area to add to his personal domain. He built the grandiose Domus Aurea on the site, in front of which he created an artificial lake surrounded by pavilions, gardens and porticoes. The existing Aqua Claudia aqueduct was extended to supply water to the area and the gigantic bronze Colossus of Nero was set up nearby at the entrance to the Domus Aurea.

Although the Colossus was preserved, much of the Domus Aurea was torn down. The lake was filled in and the land reused as the location for the new Flavian Amphitheatre. Gladiatorial schools and other support buildings were constructed nearby within the former grounds of the Domus Aurea. Vespasian's decision to build the Colosseum on the site of Nero's lake can be seen as a populist gesture of returning to the people an area of the city which Nero had appropriated for his own use. In contrast to many other amphitheatres, which were on the outskirts of a city, the Colosseum was constructed in the city centre, in effect, placing it both symbolically and geographically at the heart of Rome.

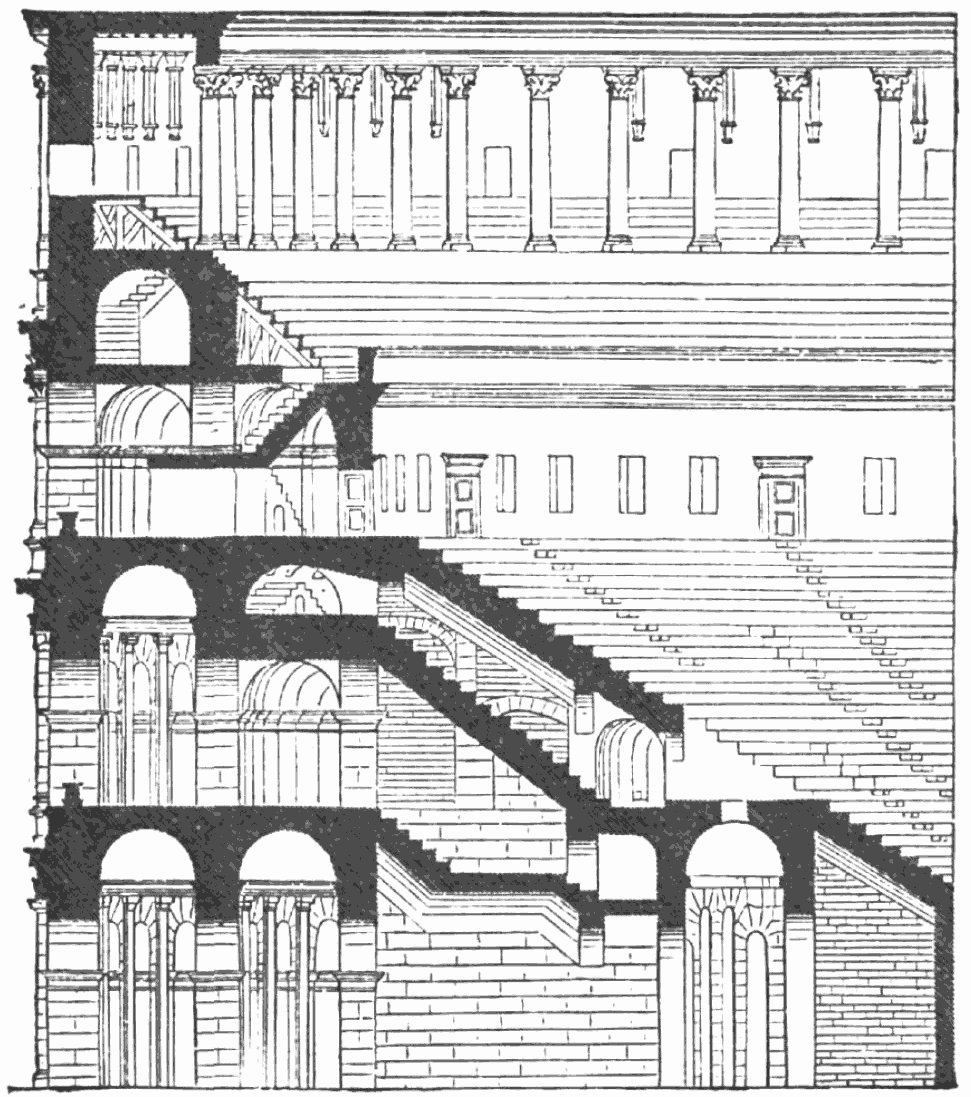
Cross-section from the Lexikon der gesamten Technik (1904)

Construction was funded by the opulent spoils taken from the Jewish Temple after the First Jewish–Roman War in 70 AD led to the Siege of Jerusalem. According to a reconstructed inscription found on the site, "the emperor Vespasian ordered this new amphitheatre to be erected from his general's share of the booty." It is often assumed, as it is with many other Roman projects at the time, that slaves and prisoners of war were brought back to Rome and contributed to the massive workforce needed for the construction of the amphitheater. Along with this free source of unskilled labor, teams of professional Roman builders, engineers, artists, painters and decorators undertook the more specialized tasks necessary for building the Colosseum. The Colosseum was constructed with several different materials: wood, limestone, tuff, tiles, cement, and mortar.

Construction of the Colosseum began under the rule of Vespasian in around 70–72 AD (73–75 AD according to some sources). The Colosseum had been completed up to the third story by the time of Vespasian's death in 79. The top level was finished by his son, Titus, in 80, and the inaugural games were held in 80 or 81 AD. Dio Cassius recounts that over 9,000 wild animals were killed during the inaugural games of the amphitheatre. Commemorative coinage was issued celebrating the inauguration. The building was remodelled further under Vespasian's younger son, the newly designated Emperor Domitian, who constructed the hypogeum, a series of tunnels used to house animals and slaves. He also added a gallery to the top of the Colosseum to increase its seating capacity.

In 217, the Colosseum was badly damaged by a major fire (caused by lightning, according to Dio Cassius), which destroyed the wooden upper levels of the amphitheatre's interior. It was not fully repaired until about 240 and underwent further repairs in 250 or 252 and again in 320. Honorius banned the practice of gladiator fights in 399 and again in 404. Gladiatorial fights are last mentioned around 435. An inscription records the restoration of various parts of the Colosseum under Theodosius II and Valentinian III (reigned 425–455), possibly to repair damage caused by a major earthquake in 443; more work followed in 484 and 508. The arena continued to be used for contests well into the 6th century. Animal hunts continued until at least 523, when Anicius Maximus celebrated his consulship with some venationes, criticised by King Theodoric the Great for their high cost.

=== Medieval ===
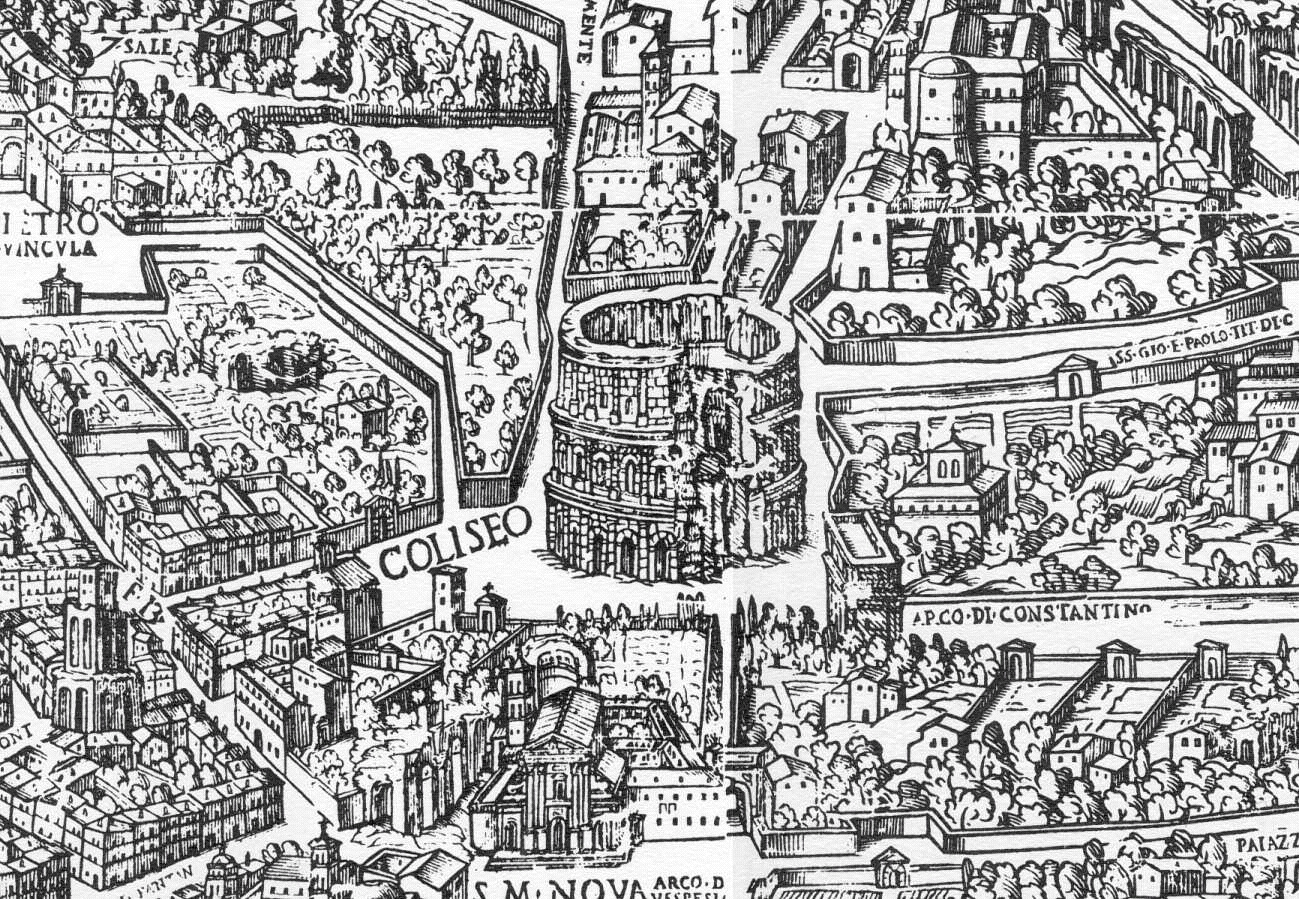
Map of medieval Rome depicting the Colosseum

The Colosseum underwent several radical changes of use. By the late 6th century a small chapel had been built into the structure of the amphitheater, though this apparently did not confer any particular religious significance on the building as a whole. The arena was converted into a cemetery. The numerous vaulted spaces in the arcades under the seating were converted into housing and workshops, and are recorded as still being rented out as late as the 12th century. Around 1200 the Frangipani family took over the Colosseum and fortified it, apparently using it as a castle. In the early to mid 14th century, the Pope's relocation to Avignon caused a population decline in Rome that left the region insecure. The colosseum was largely abandoned by the public and became a popular den for bandits.

Severe damage was inflicted on the Colosseum by the great earthquake in 1349, causing the outer south side, lying on a less stable alluvial terrain, to collapse. Much of the tumbled stone was reused to build palaces, churches, hospitals and other buildings elsewhere in Rome. In 1377, after the Pope's return to Rome, the Colosseum was restored by a religious order called Arciconfraternita del SS. Salvatore ad Sancta Sanctorum, who then inhabited a northern portion of it until as late as the early 19th century. The interior of the amphitheater was extensively stripped of stone, which was reused elsewhere, or (in the case of the marble façade) was burned to make quicklime. The iron clamps which held the stonework together were pried or hacked out of the walls, leaving numerous pockmarks which still scar the building today.

=== Modern ===
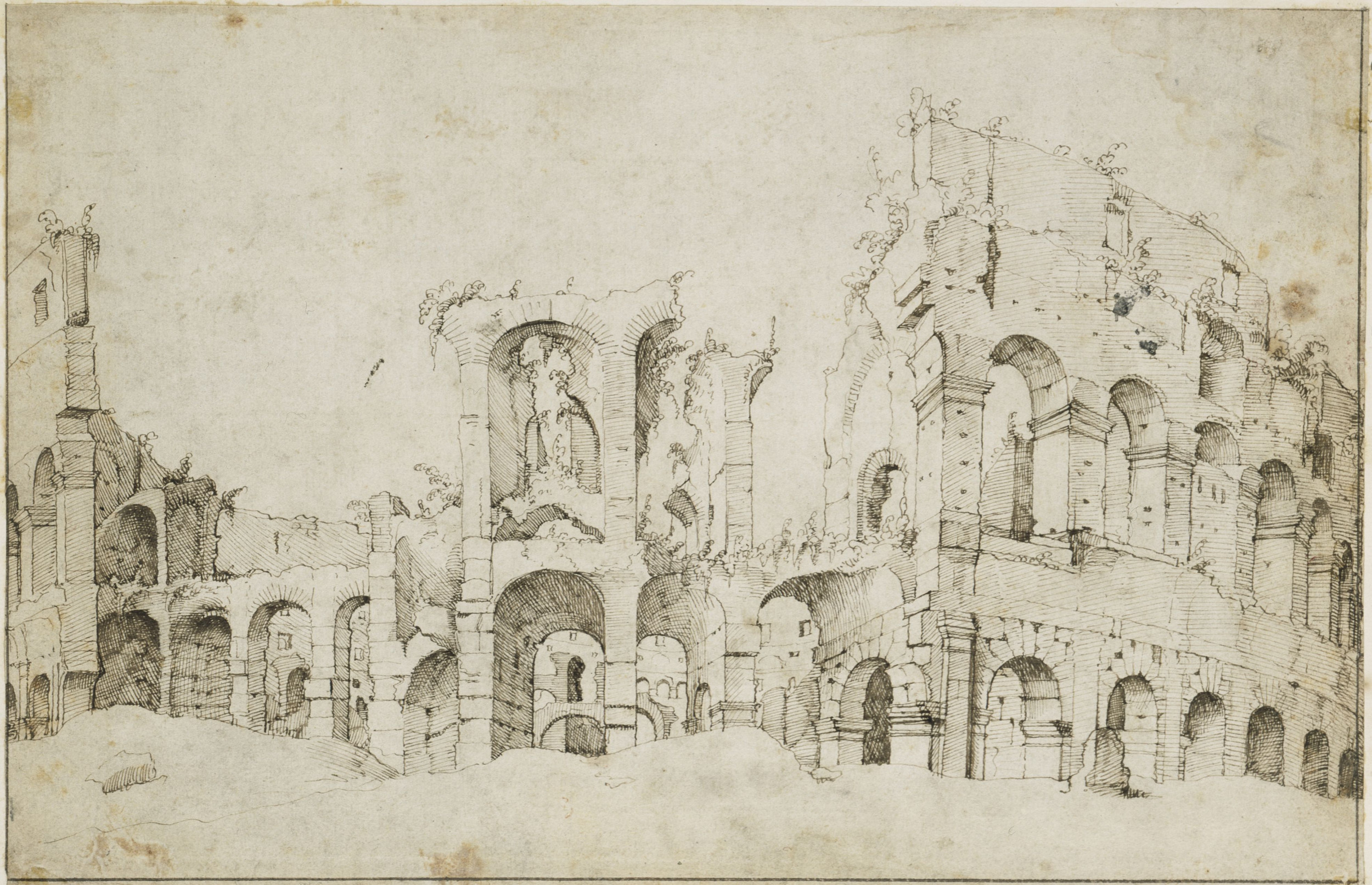
The Colosseum in the 1530s, sketched by Maarten van Heemskerck, and used as the model for his later Self-Portrait with the Colosseum and Octo Mundi Miracula.

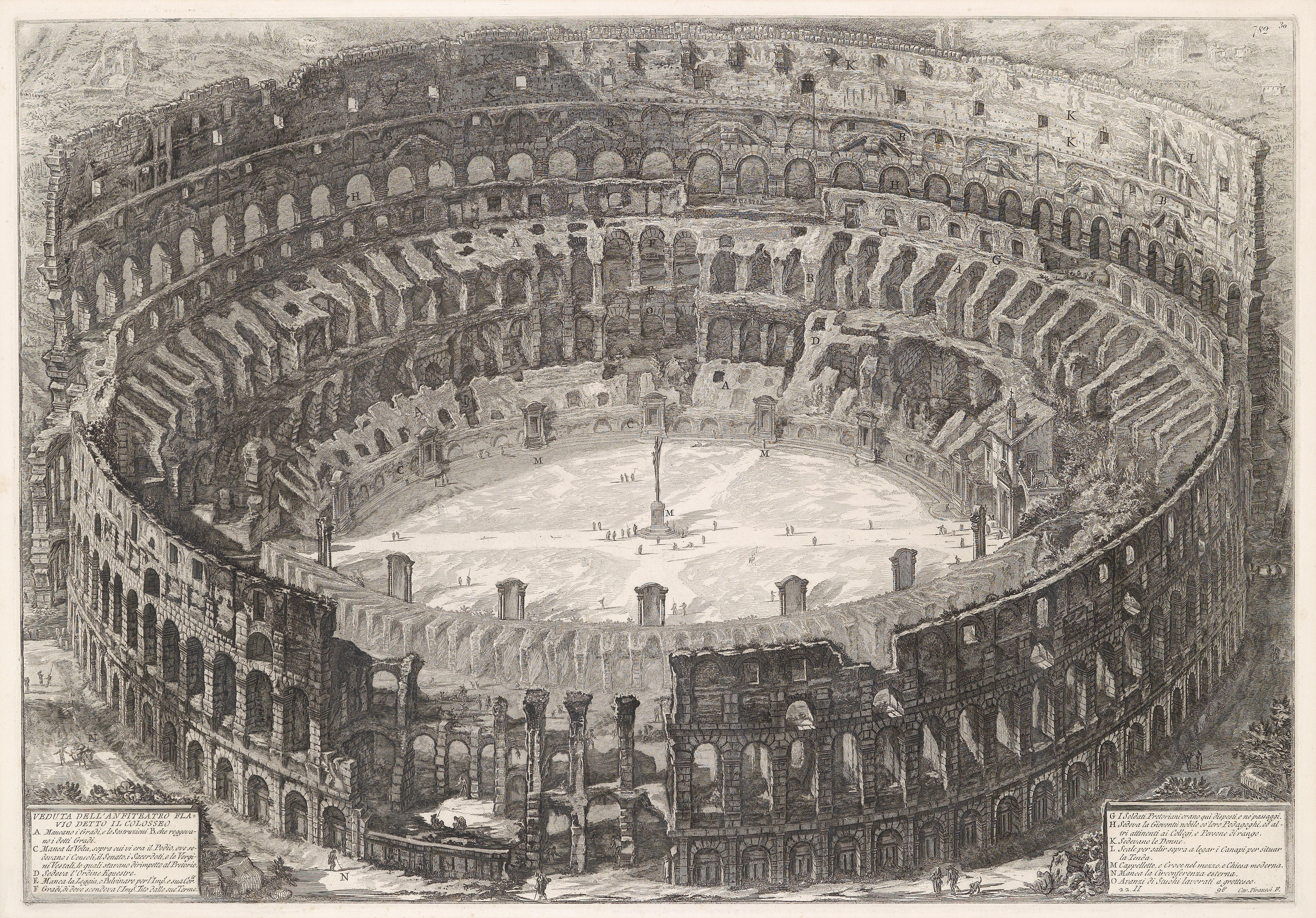
Overview of the interior of the Colosseum in a 1776 engraving by Giovanni Battista Piranesi

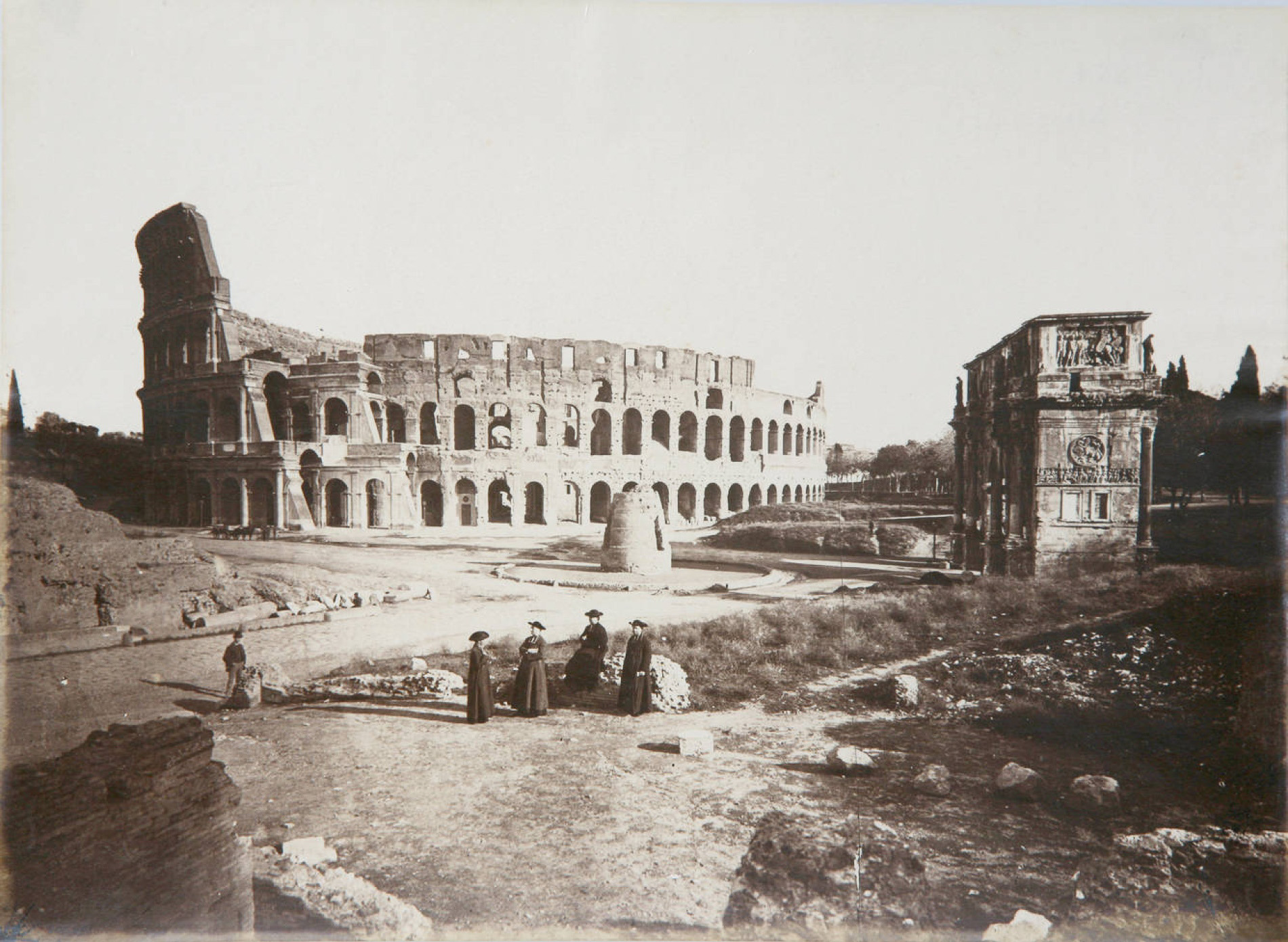
1870 view emphasizing the semi-rural environs of the Colosseum at the time

During the 16th and 17th century, Church officials sought a productive role for the Colosseum. Pope Sixtus V (1585–1590) planned to turn the building into a wool factory to provide employment for Rome's prostitutes, though this proposal fell through with his premature death. In 1671, Cardinal Paluzzo Altieri authorized its use for bullfights; a public outcry caused the idea to be hastily abandoned.

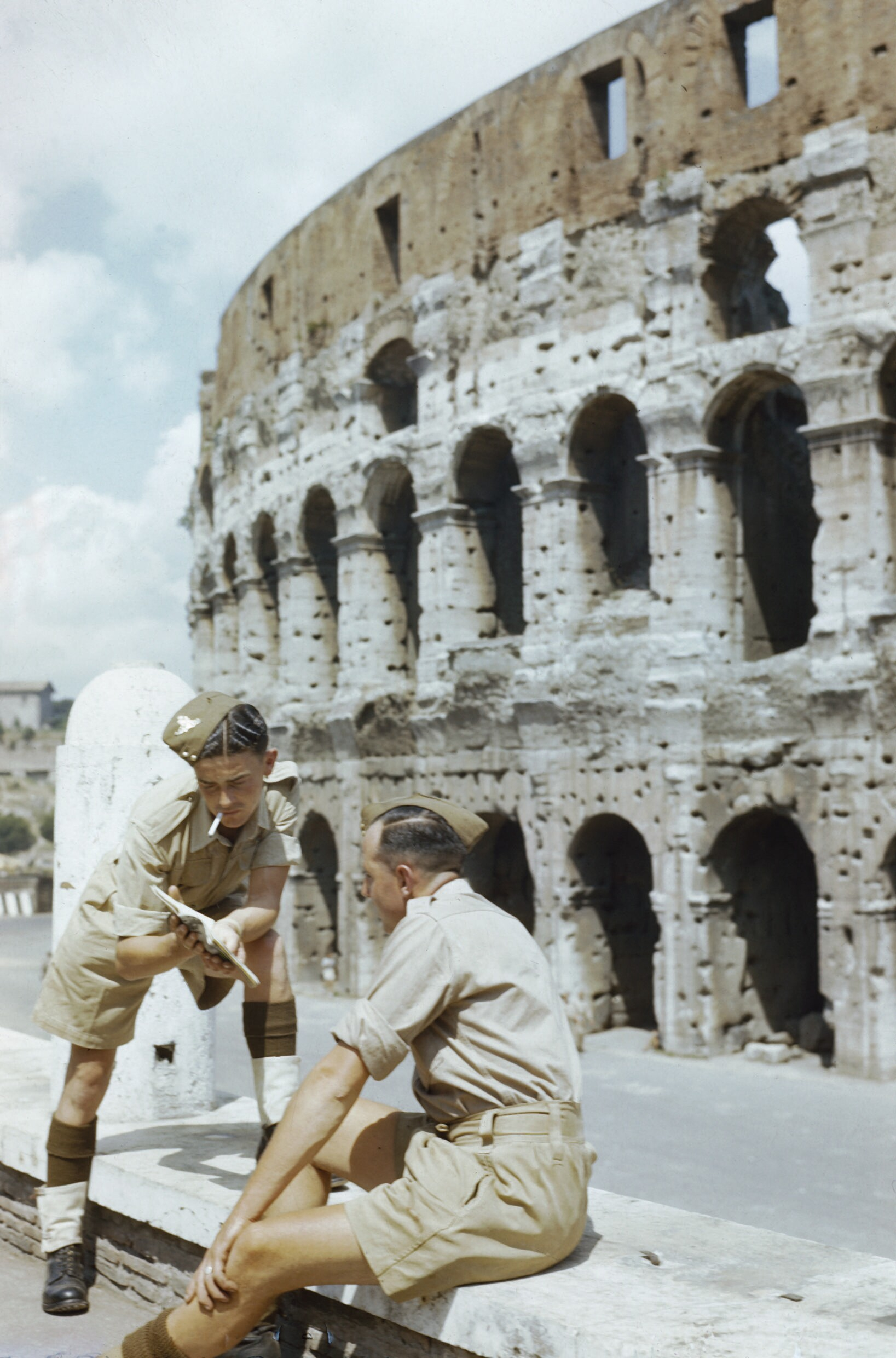
Allied troops consult a guidebook outside the Colosseum after liberation in 1944

In 1749, Pope Benedict XIV endorsed the view that the Colosseum was a sacred site where early Christians had been martyred. He forbade the use of the Colosseum as a quarry and consecrated the building to the Passion of Christ and installed Stations of the Cross, declaring it sanctified by the blood of the Christian martyrs who perished there (see Significance in Christianity).

However, there is no historical evidence to support Benedict's claim, nor is there even any evidence that anyone before the 16th century suggested this might be the case; the Catholic Encyclopedia concludes that there are no historical grounds for the supposition, other than the reasonably plausible conjecture that some of the many martyrs may well have been martyred there.

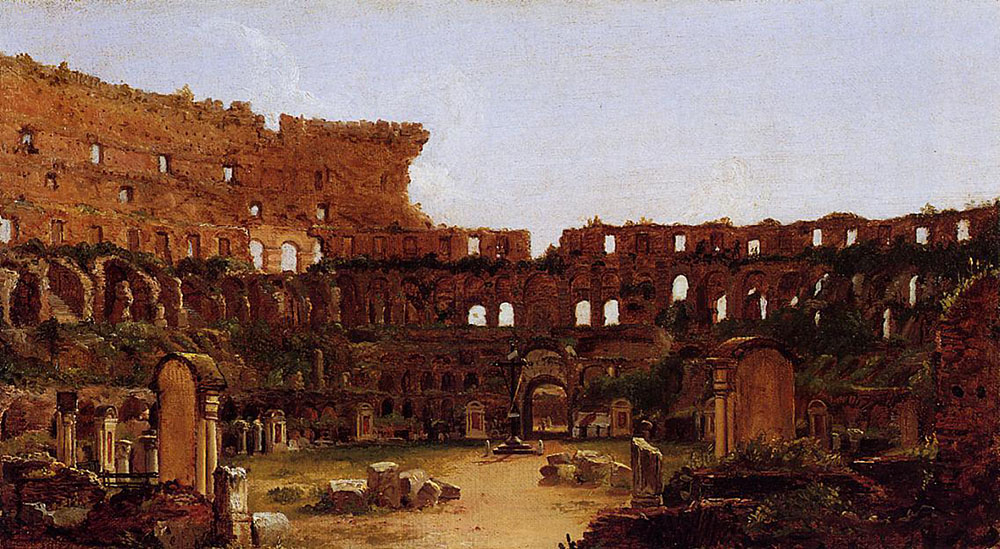
Interior of the Colosseum, Rome (1832) by Thomas Cole, showing the Stations of the Cross around the arena and the extensive vegetation

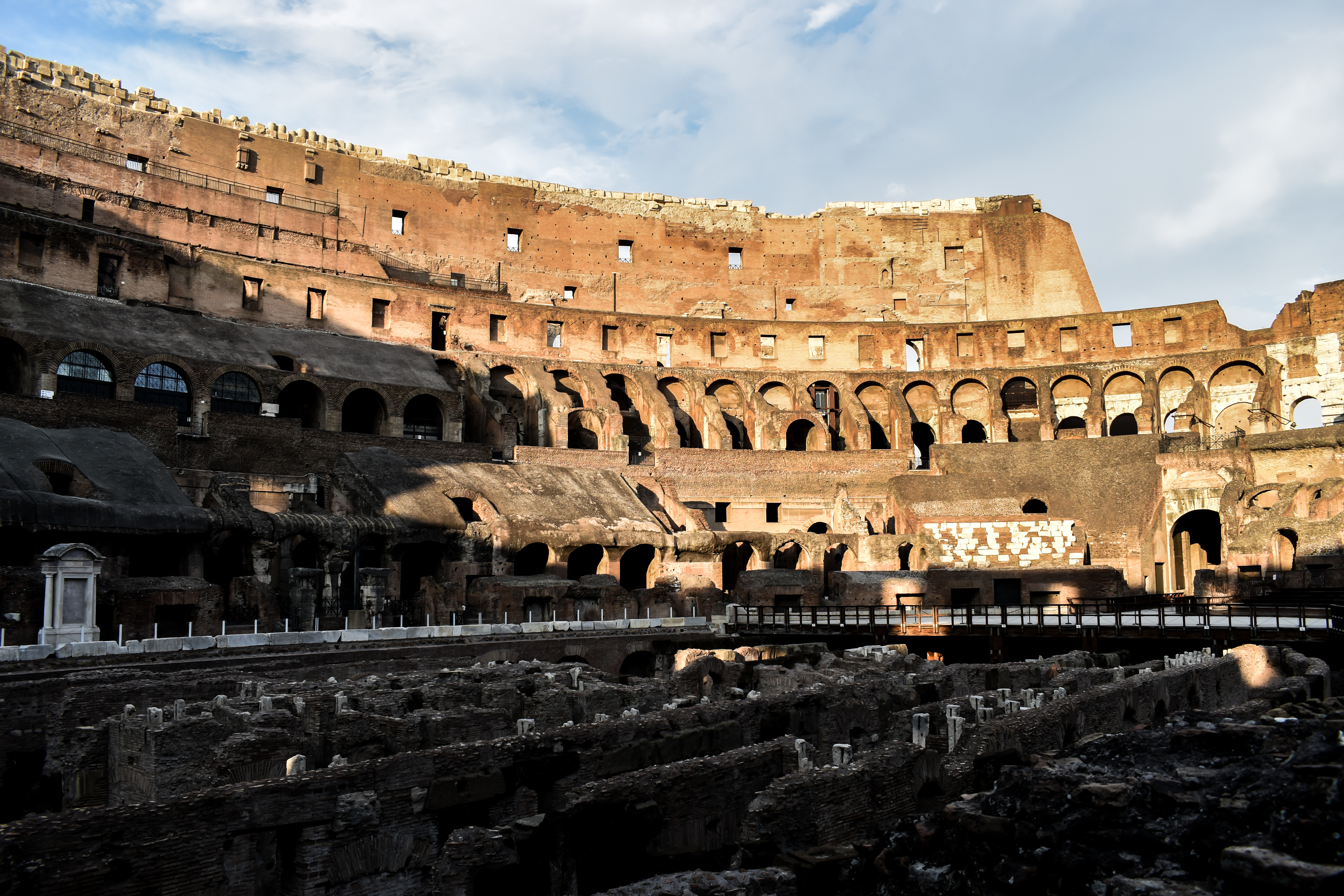
Eastern interior (viewed from west), 2023

Later popes initiated various stabilization and restoration projects, removing the extensive vegetation which had overgrown the structure and threatened to damage it further. The façade was reinforced with triangular brick wedges in 1807 and 1827, and the interior was repaired in 1831, 1846 and in the 1930s. The arena substructure was partly excavated in 1810–1814 and 1874 and was fully exposed under Benito Mussolini in the 1930s.

The Colosseum is today one of Rome's most popular tourist attractions, receiving millions of visitors annually. The effects of pollution and general deterioration over time prompted a major restoration programme carried out between 1993 and 2000, at a cost of 40 billion lire ($19.3 million or €20.6 million at 2000 prices).

In recent years, the Colosseum has become a symbol of the international campaign against capital punishment, which was abolished in Italy in 1948. Several anti–death penalty demonstrations took place in front of the Colosseum in 2000. Since that time, as a gesture against the death penalty, the local authorities of Rome change the color of the Colosseum's night time illumination from white to gold whenever a person condemned to the death penalty anywhere in the world gets their sentence commuted or is released, or if a jurisdiction abolishes the death penalty. For example, the Colosseum was illuminated in gold in November 2012 following the abolishment of capital punishment in the American state of Connecticut in April 2012.

Because of the ruined state of the interior, it is impractical to use the Colosseum to host large events; only a few hundred spectators can be accommodated in temporary seating. However, much larger concerts have been held just outside, using the Colosseum as a backdrop. Performers who have played at the Colosseum have included Ray Charles (May 2002), Paul McCartney (May 2003), Elton John (September 2005), and Billy Joel (July 2006).

== Physical description ==
=== Exterior ===
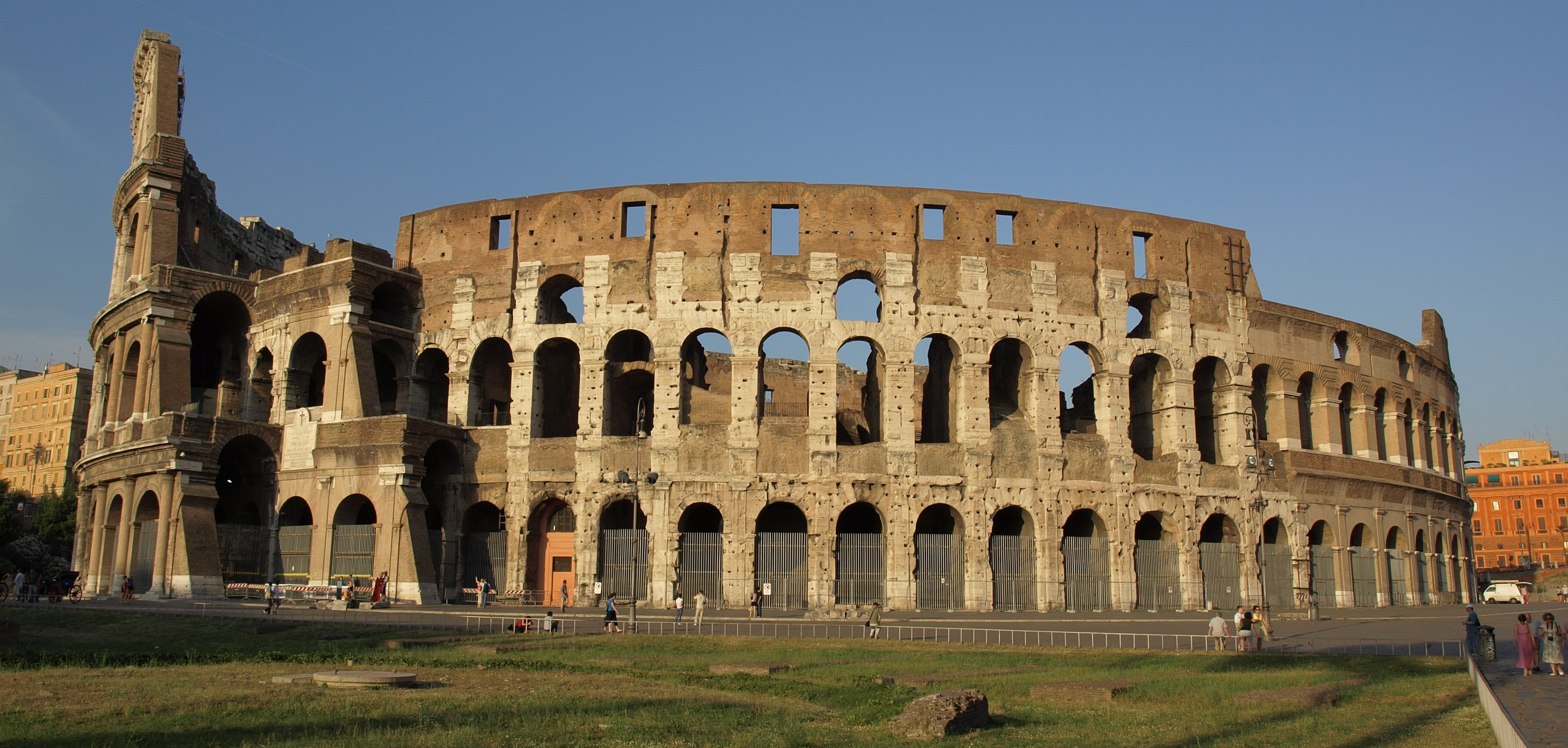
The exterior of the Colosseum, showing the partially intact outer wall (left) and the mostly intact inner wall (center and right)

Unlike Roman theatres that were built into hillsides, the Colosseum is an entirely free-standing structure. It derives its basic exterior and interior architecture from that of two theatres back to back. It is elliptical in plan and is 189 meters (615 ft / 640 Roman feet) long, and 156 meters (510 ft / 528 Roman feet) wide, with a base area of 24,000 square metres (6 acres). The height of the outer wall is 48 meters (157 ft / 165 Roman feet). The perimeter originally measured 545 meters (1,788 ft / 1,835 Roman feet). The central arena is an ellipse 87 m (287 ft) long and 55 m (180 ft) wide, surrounded by a wall 5 m (15 ft) high, above which rose tiers of seating.

The outer wall is estimated to have required over 100,000 cubic metres (3.5 million cubic feet) of travertine stone which were set without mortar; they were held together by 300 tons of iron clamps. However, it has suffered extensive damage over the centuries, with large segments having collapsed following earthquakes. The north side of the perimeter wall is still standing; the distinctive triangular brick wedges at each end are modern additions, having been constructed in the early 19th century to shore up the wall. The remainder of the present-day exterior of the Colosseum is in fact the original interior wall.

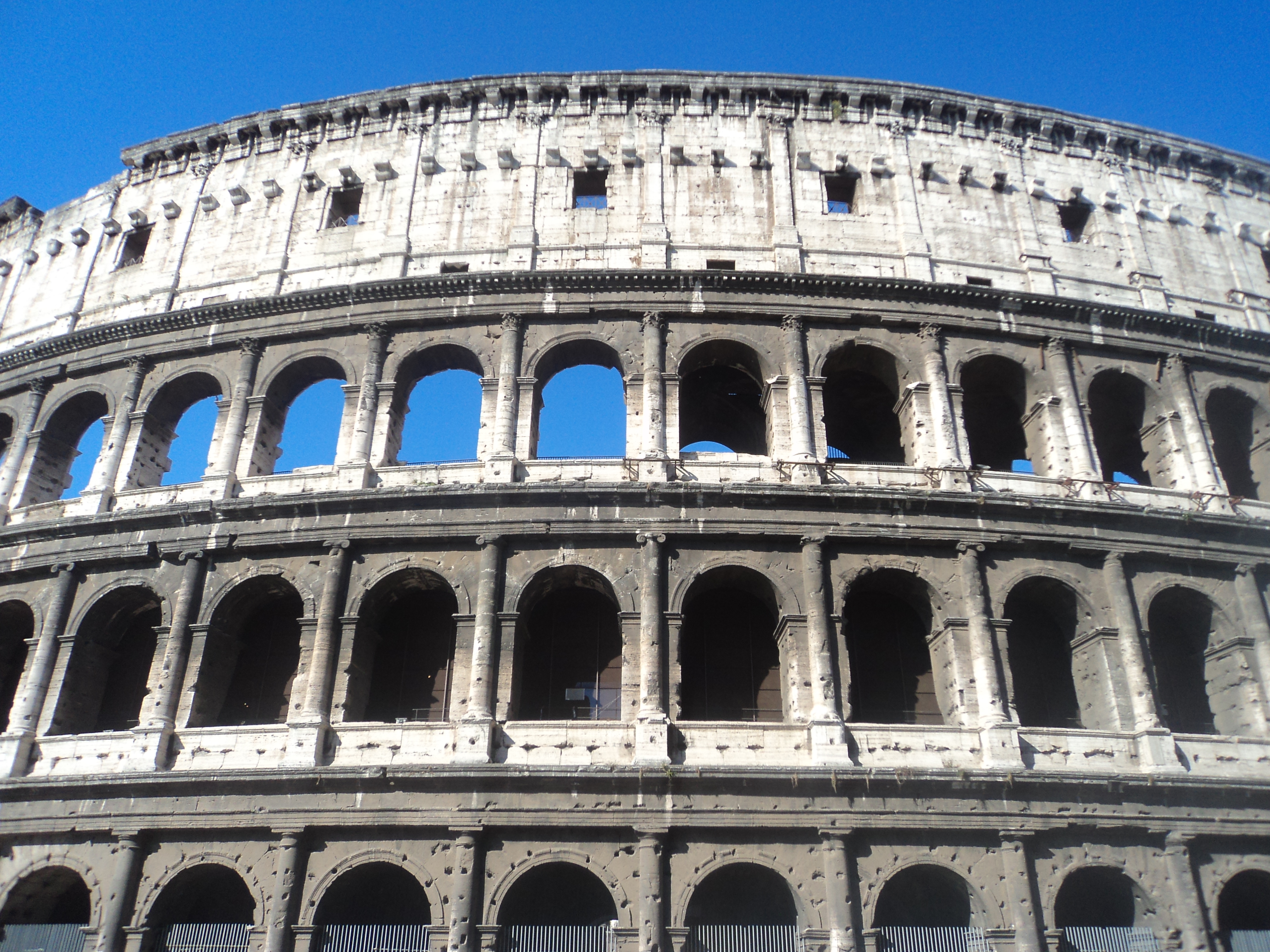
Superposed order of the Colosseum

The surviving part of the outer wall's monumental façade comprises three superposed storeys surmounted by a podium on which stands a tall attic, both of which are pierced by windows interspersed at regular intervals. The arcades are framed by engaged columns of the Doric, Ionic, and Corinthian orders, while the attic is decorated with Corinthian pilasters. Each of the arches in the second- and third-floor arcades framed statues, probably honoring divinities and other figures from Classical mythology.

Two hundred and forty mast corbels were positioned around the top of the attic. They originally supported a retractable awning, known as the velarium, that kept the sun and rain off spectators. This consisted of a canvas-covered, net-like structure made of ropes, with a hole in the center. It covered two-thirds of the arena, and sloped down towards the center to catch the wind and provide a breeze for the audience. Sailors, specially enlisted from the Roman naval headquarters at Misenum and housed in the nearby Castra Misenatium, were used to work the velarium.

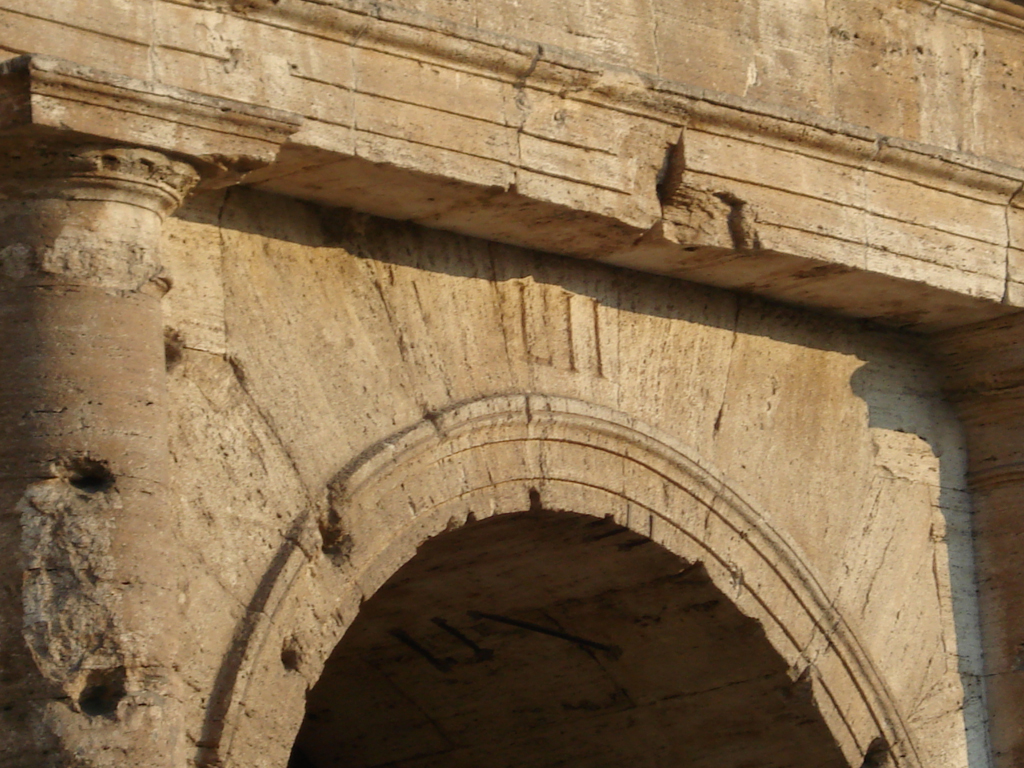
Entrance LII of the Colosseum, with Roman numerals still visible

The Colosseum's huge crowd capacity made it essential that the venue could be filled or evacuated quickly. Its architects adopted solutions very similar to those used in modern stadia to deal with the same problem. The amphitheatre was ringed by eighty entrances at ground level, 76 of which were used by ordinary spectators. Each entrance and exit was numbered, as was each staircase. The northern main entrance was reserved for the Roman Emperor and his aides, whilst the other three axial entrances were most likely used by the elite. All four axial entrances were richly decorated with painted stucco reliefs, of which fragments survive. Many of the original outer entrances have disappeared with the collapse of the perimeter wall, but entrances XXIII (23) to LIIII (54) survive.

Spectators were given tickets in the form of numbered pottery shards, which directed them to the appropriate section and row. They accessed their seats via vomitoria (singular vomitorium), passageways that opened into a tier of seats from below or behind. These quickly dispersed people into their seats and, upon conclusion of the event or in an emergency evacuation, could permit their exit within only a few minutes. The name vomitoria derived from the Latin word for a rapid discharge, from which English derives the word vomit.

=== Interior seating ===
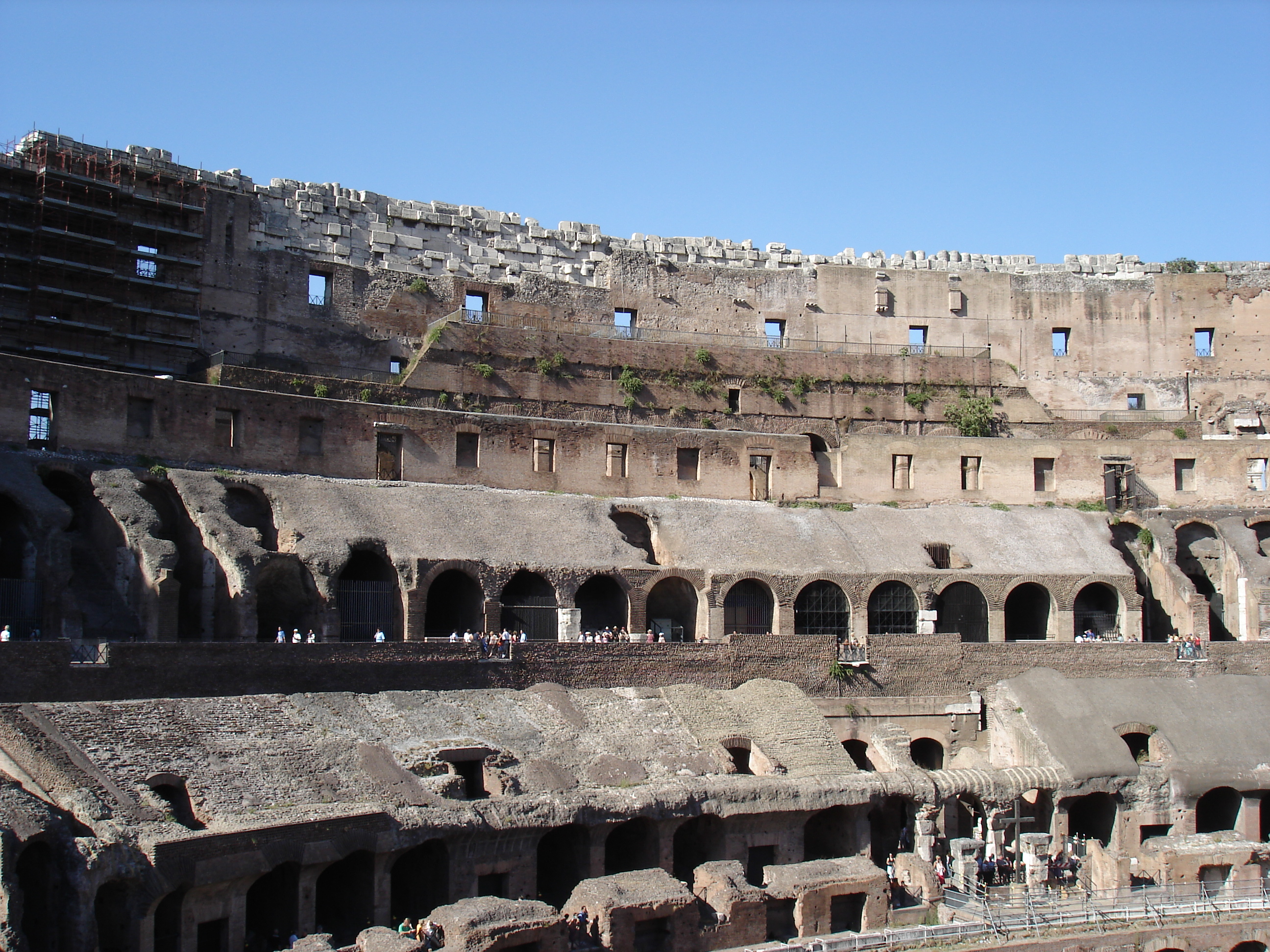
The raked areas that once held seating

According to the Codex-Calendar of 354, the Colosseum could accommodate 87,000 people, although modern estimates put the figure at around 50,000. They were seated in a tiered arrangement that reflected the rigidly stratified nature of Roman society. Special boxes were provided at the north and south ends respectively for the Emperor and the Vestal Virgins, providing the best views of the arena. Flanking them at the same level was a broad platform or podium for the senatorial class, who were allowed to bring their own chairs. The names of some 5th century senators can still be seen carved into the stonework, presumably reserving areas for their use.

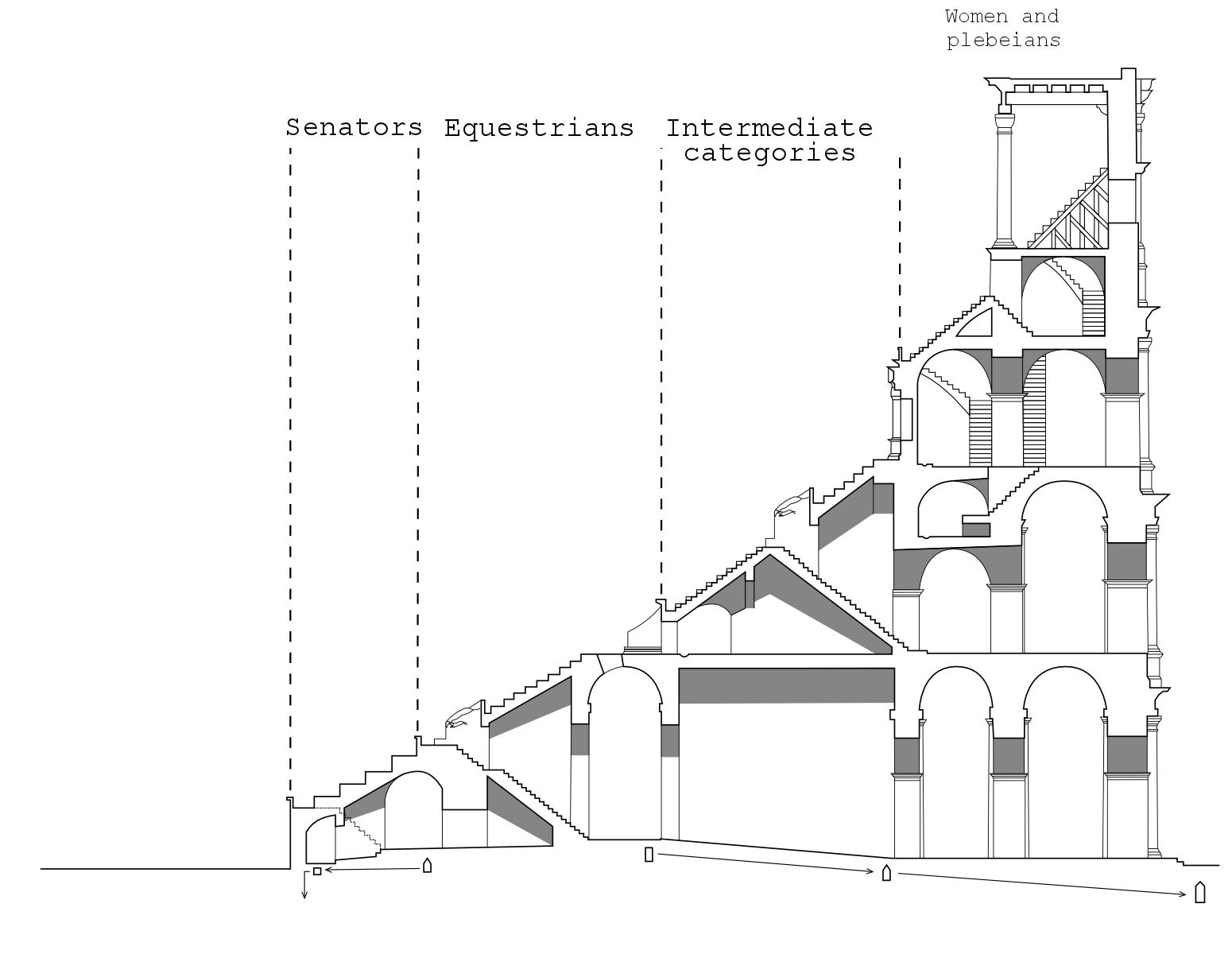
Diagram of the levels of seating

The tier above the senators, known as the maenianum primum, was occupied by the non-senatorial noble class or knights (equites). The next level up, the maenianum secundum, was originally reserved for ordinary Roman citizens (plebeians) and was divided into two sections. The lower part (the immum) was for wealthy citizens, while the upper part (the summum) was for poor citizens. Specific sectors were provided for other social groups: for instance, boys with their tutors, soldiers on leave, foreign dignitaries, scribes, heralds, priests and so on. Stone (and later marble) seating was provided for the citizens and nobles, who presumably would have brought their own cushions with them. Inscriptions identified the areas reserved for specific groups.

Another level, the maenianum secundum in legneis, was added at the very top of the building during the reign of Domitian. This comprised a gallery for the common poor, slaves and women. It would have been either standing room only, or would have had very steep wooden benches. Some groups were banned altogether from the Colosseum, notably gravediggers, actors and former gladiators.

Each tier was divided into sections (maeniana) by curved passages and low walls (praecinctiones or baltei), and were subdivided into cunei, or wedges, by the steps and aisles from the vomitoria. Each row (gradus) of seats was numbered, permitting each individual seat to be exactly designated by its gradus, cuneus, and number.

=== Arena and hypogeum ===
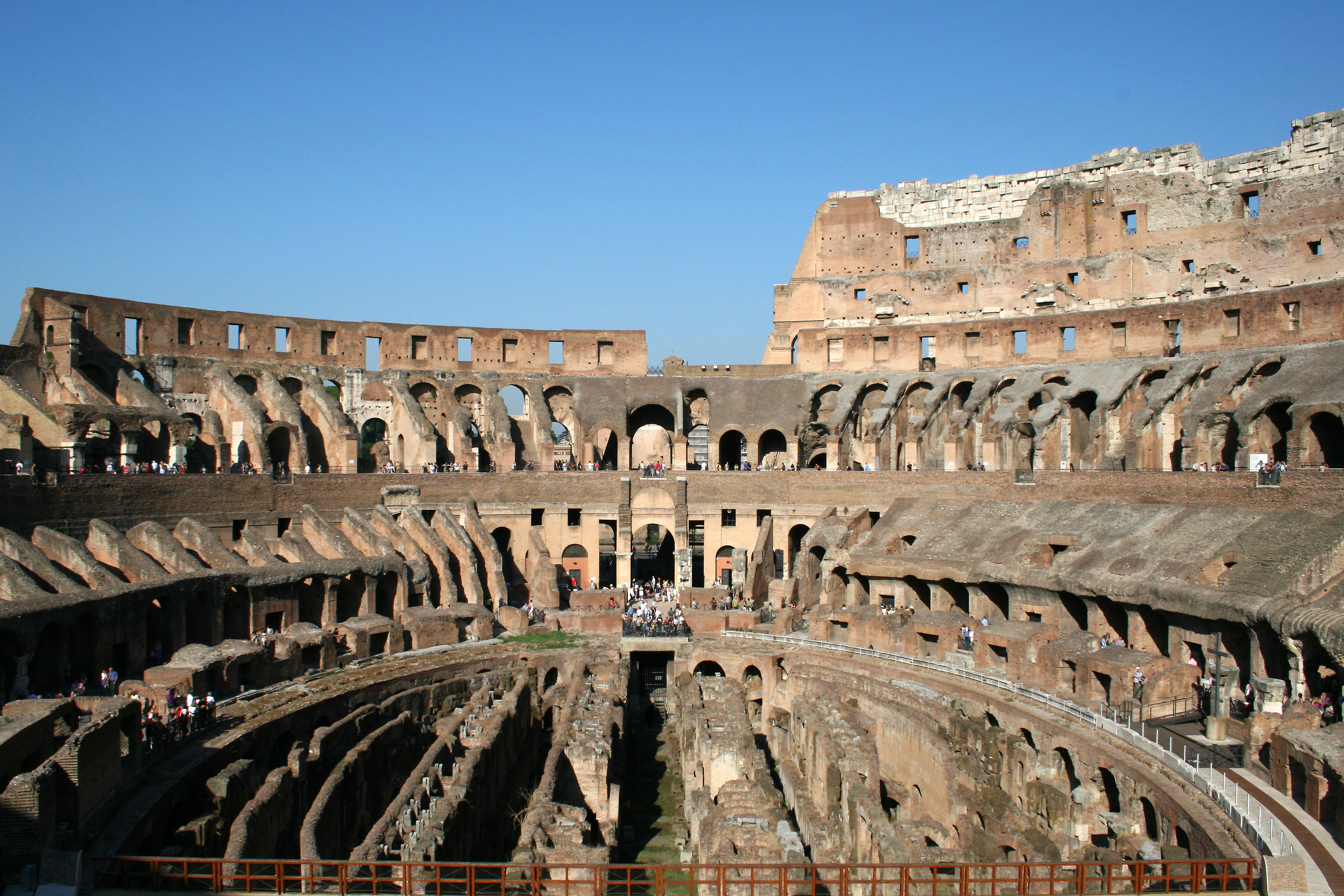
The Colosseum arena, showing the hypogeum now filled with walls. The walls were added early in the Colosseum's existence when it was decided it would no longer be flooded and used for naval battles.

The arena itself was 83 meters by 48 meters (272 ft by 157 ft / 280 by 163 Roman feet). It comprised a wooden floor covered by sand (the Latin word for sand is harena or arena), covering an elaborate underground structure called the hypogeum (literally meaning "underground"). The hypogeum was not part of the original construction but was ordered to be built by Domitian. Little now remains of the original arena floor, but the hypogeum is still clearly visible. It consisted of a two-level subterranean network of tunnels and cages beneath the arena where gladiators and animals were held before contests began. Eighty vertical shafts provided instant access to the arena for caged animals and scenery pieces concealed underneath; larger hinged platforms, called hegmata, provided access for elephants and the like. It was restructured on numerous occasions; at least twelve different phases of construction can be seen.

The hypogeum was connected by tunnels to a number of points outside the Colosseum. Animals and performers were brought through the tunnel from nearby stables, with the gladiators' barracks at the Ludus Magnus to the east also being connected by tunnels. Separate tunnels were provided for the Emperor and the Vestal Virgins to permit them to enter and exit the Colosseum without needing to pass through the crowds.

Substantial quantities of machinery also existed in the hypogeum. Elevators and pulleys raised and lowered scenery and props, as well as lifting caged animals to the surface for release. There is evidence for the existence of major hydraulic mechanisms and according to ancient accounts, it was possible to flood the arena rapidly, presumably via a connection to a nearby aqueduct. However, the construction of the hypogeum at Domitian's behest put an end to the practise of flooding, and thus also to naval battles, early in the Colosseum's existence. However, there is ample debate over the practicality and logistics of this phenomenon, which leads to speculation over its actuality. This is mostly because there is no physical evidence of naumachiae at the Colosseum remains.

=== Supporting buildings ===
The Colosseum and its activities supported a substantial industry in the area. In addition to the amphitheatre itself, many other buildings nearby were linked to the games. Immediately to the east is the remains of the Ludus Magnus, a training school for gladiators. This was connected to the Colosseum by an underground passage, to allow easy access for the gladiators. The Ludus Magnus had its own miniature training arena, which was itself a popular attraction for Roman spectators. Other training schools were in the same area, including the Ludus Matutinus (Morning School), where fighters of animals were trained, plus the Dacian and Gallic Schools.

Also nearby were the Armamentarium, comprising an armory to store weapons; the Summum Choragium, where machinery was stored; the Sanitarium, which had facilities to treat wounded gladiators; and the Spoliarium, where bodies of dead gladiators were stripped of their armor and disposed of.

Around the perimeter of the Colosseum, at a distance of 18 m (59 ft) from the perimeter, was a series of tall stone posts, with five remaining on the eastern side. Various explanations have been advanced for their presence; they may have been a religious boundary, or an outer boundary for ticket checks, or an anchor for the velarium or awning.

The Commodus Passage, named after Commodus, was used by Roman emperors to enter the Colosseum discreetly. A failed assassination attempt against Commodus occurred in the passage. It was rediscovered in the 1810s. Restoration work which restored decorative stuccoes and added a walkway was conducted on the passage from October 2024 to September 2025. The passage will be opened to the public on 27 October 2025. Another restoration project is planned to begin in 2026.

== Use ==
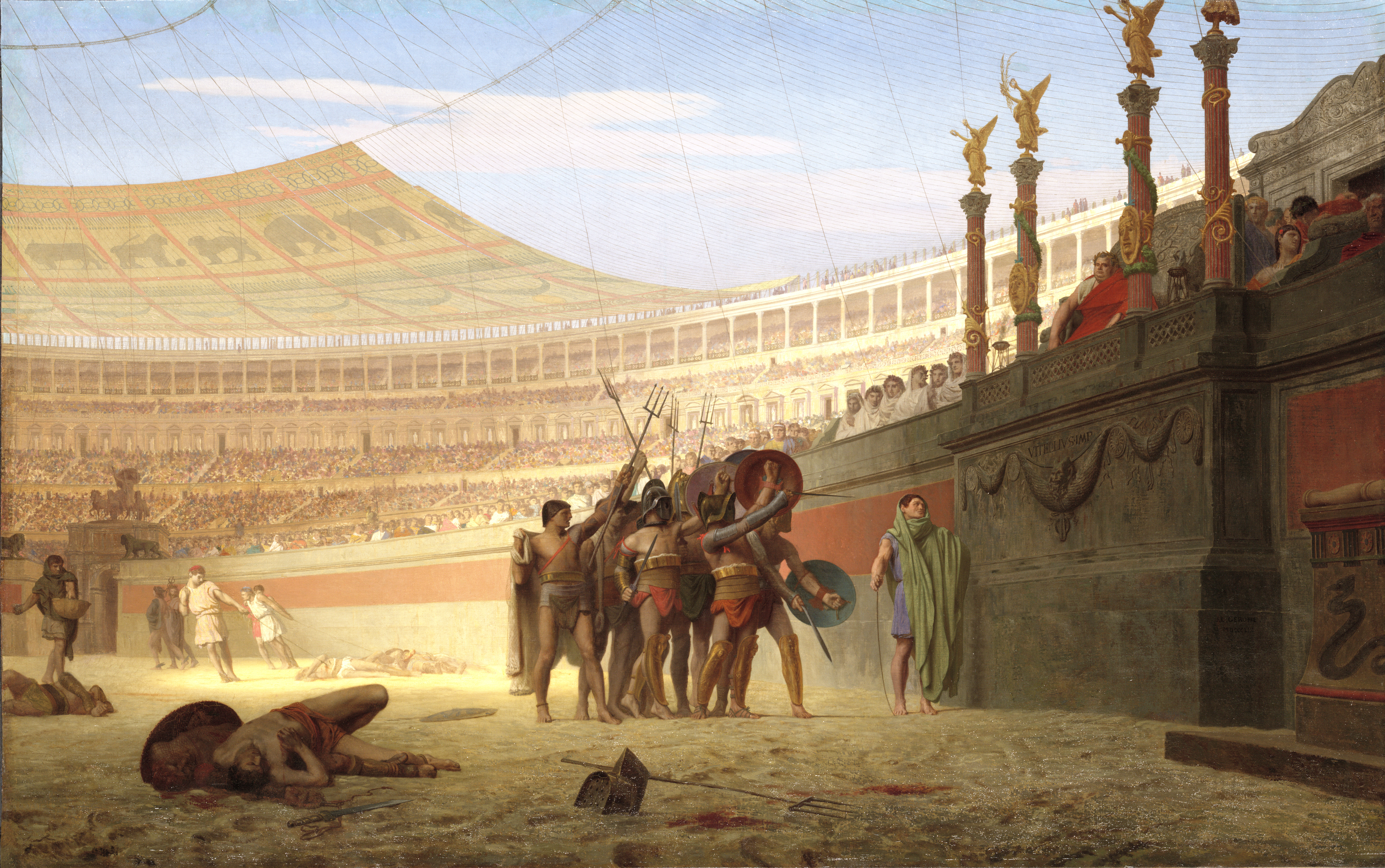
Ave Imperator, morituri te salutant (Hail, Cesar, those who will die salute you), by Jean-Léon Gérôme, 1859

The Colosseum was used to host gladiatorial shows as well as a variety of other events. The shows, called munera, were always given by private individuals rather than the state. They had a strong religious element but were also demonstrations of power and family prestige and were immensely popular. Another major attraction was the animal hunt, or venatio. This utilized a great variety of wild beasts, mainly imported from Africa and the Middle East, and included creatures such as rhinoceros, hippopotamuses, elephants, giraffes, aurochs, wisents, Barbary lions, panthers, leopards, bears, Caspian tigers, crocodiles and ostriches. Battles and hunts were often staged amid elaborate sets with movable trees and buildings. These events could be huge in scale; Trajan is said to have celebrated his victories in Dacia in 107 with contests involving 11,000 animals and 10,000 gladiators over the course of 123 days. During lunch intervals, executions ad bestias would be staged. Those condemned to death would be sent into the arena, naked and unarmed, to face the beasts of death which would literally tear them to pieces. Acrobats and magicians would also perform, usually during the intervals.

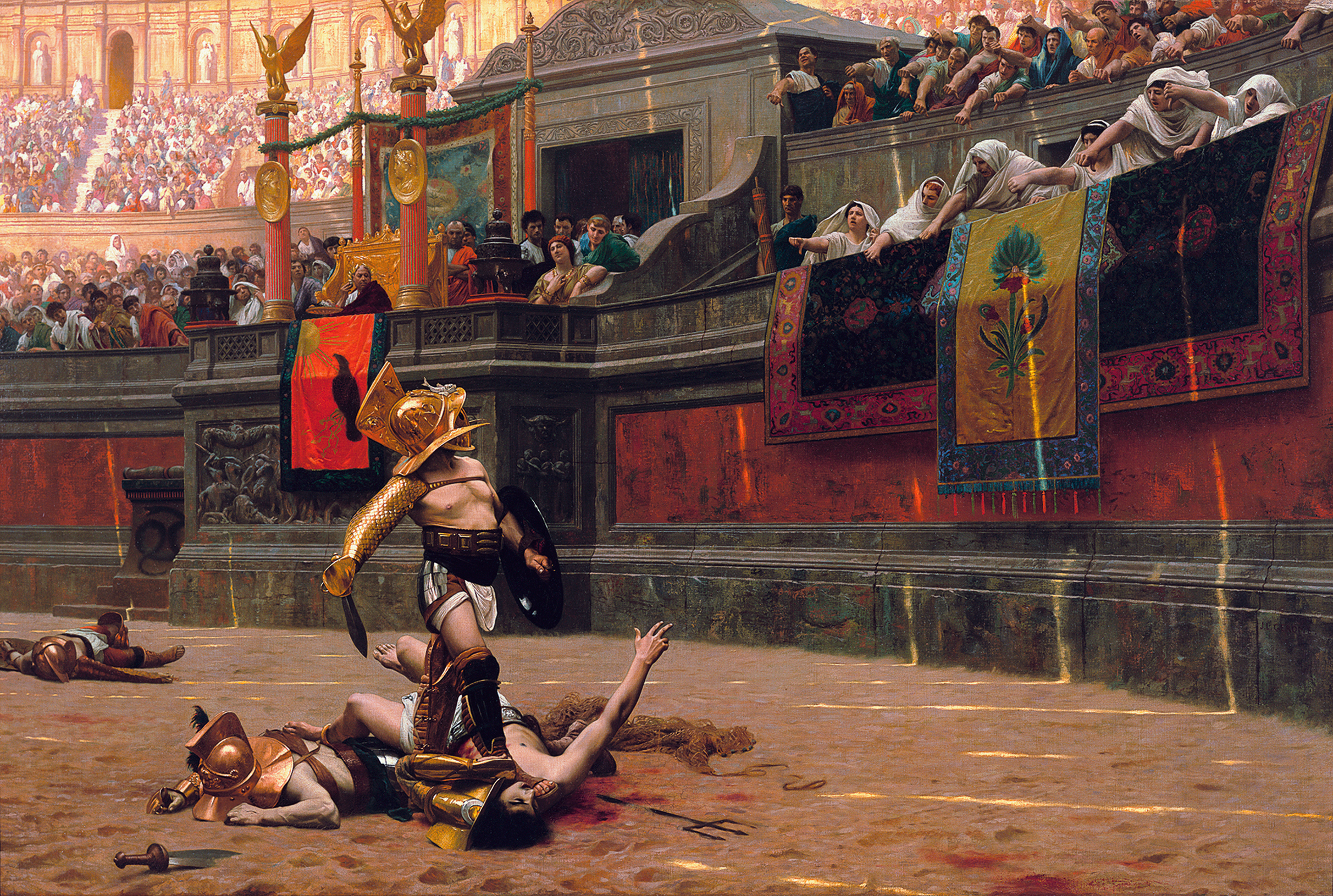
Pollice Verso (Thumbs Down) by Jean-Léon Gérôme, 1872

During the early days of the Colosseum, ancient writers recorded that the building was used for naumachiae (more properly known as navalia proelia) or simulated sea battles. Accounts of the inaugural games held by Titus in AD 80 describe it being filled with water for a display of specially trained swimming horses and bulls. There is also an account of a re-enactment of a famous sea battle between the Corcyrean (Corfiot) Greeks and the Corinthians. This has been the subject of some debate among historians; although providing the water would not have been a problem, it is unclear how the arena could have been waterproofed, nor would there have been enough space in the arena for the warships to move around. It has been suggested that the reports either have the location wrong or that the Colosseum originally featured a wide floodable channel down its central axis (which would later have been replaced by the hypogeum).

Sylvae or recreations of natural scenes were also held in the arena. Painters, technicians and architects would construct a simulation of a forest with real trees and bushes planted in the arena's floor, and animals would then be introduced. Such scenes might be used simply to display a natural environment for the urban population, or could otherwise be used as the backdrop for hunts or dramas depicting episodes from mythology. They were also occasionally used for executions in which the hero of the story—played by a condemned person—was killed in one of various gruesome but mythologically authentic ways, such as being mauled by beasts or burned to death.

=== Modern use ===
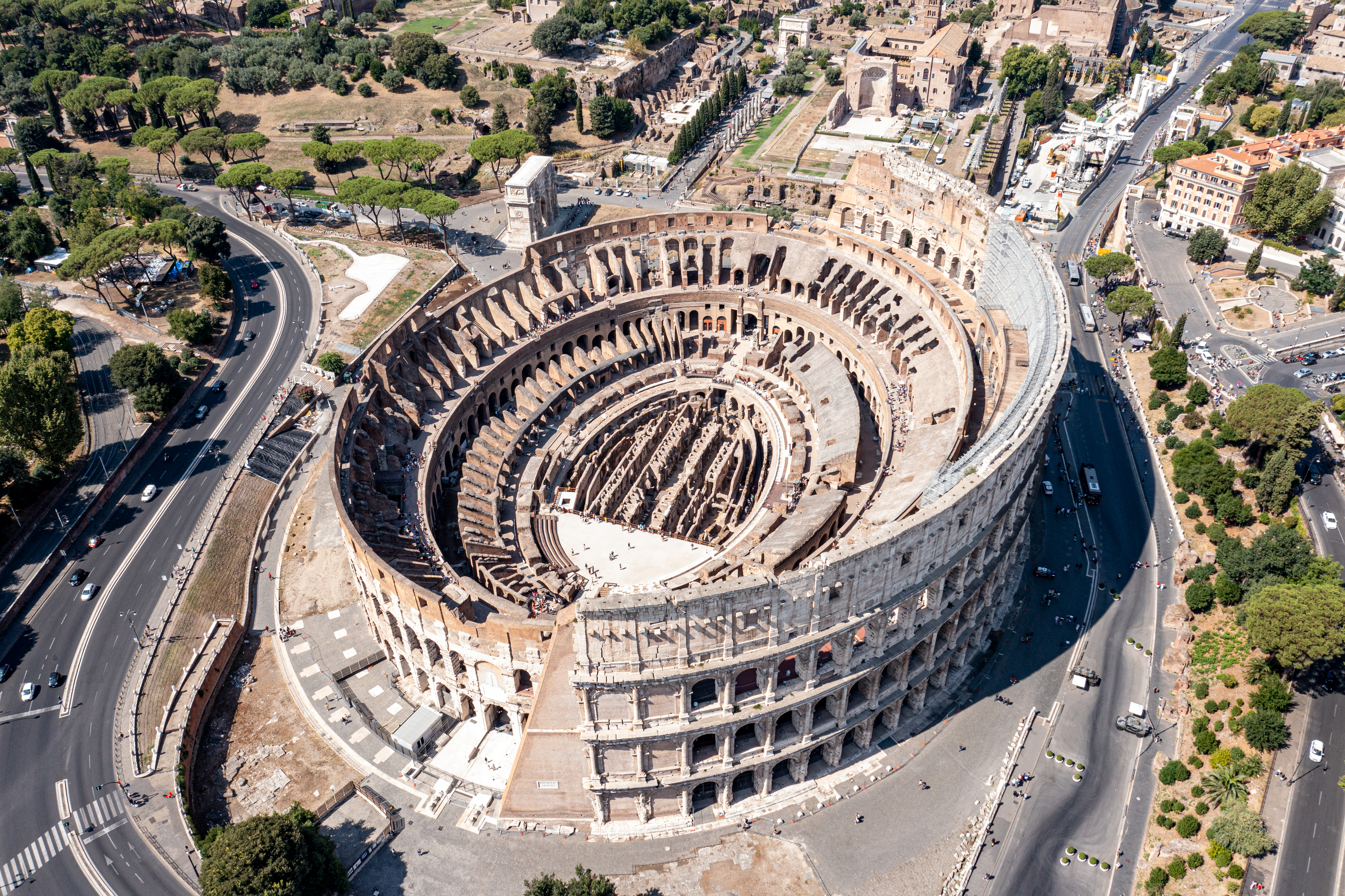
Aerial view of the Colosseum, 2021

Beneath the Colosseum, a network of subterranean passageways that were once used for transporting wild animals and gladiators to the arena, opened to the public in summer 2010.

The Colosseum is also the site of Roman Catholic ceremonies in the 20th and 21st centuries. For instance, Pope Benedict XVI led the Stations of the Cross called the Scriptural Way of the Cross (which calls for more meditation) at the Colosseum on Good Fridays.

==== Restoration ====
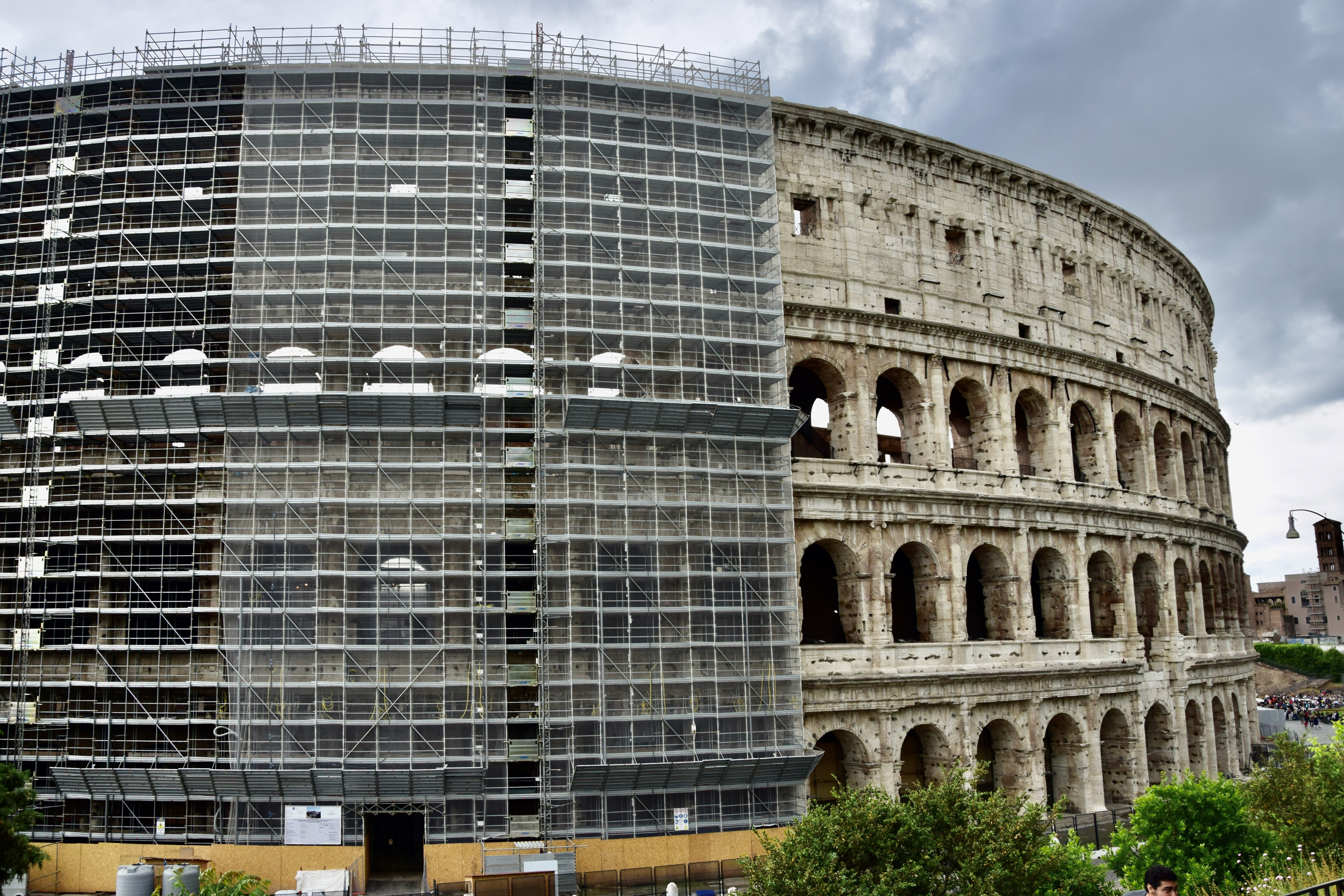
Colosseum under renovation, 2015

In 2011, Diego Della Valle, head of the shoe firm Tod's, entered into an agreement with local officials to sponsor a €25 million restoration of the Colosseum. Work was planned to begin at the end of 2011, taking up to two and a half years. Due to the controversial nature of using a public–private partnership to fund the restoration, work was delayed and began in 2013. The restoration is the first full cleaning and repair in the Colosseum's history. The first stage is to clean and restore the Colosseum's arcaded façade and replace the metal enclosures that block the ground-level arches. After three years, the work was completed on 1 July 2016, when the Italian minister of culture, Dario Franceschini, also announced that the funds have been committed to replace the floors by the end of 2018. These will provide a stage that Franceschini says will be used for "cultural events of the highest level." The project also includes creating a services center and restoring the galleries and underground spaces inside the Colosseum. Since 2017, the top two levels have been opened for guided visits. The fourth level held the marketplace, and the top fifth tier is where the poorest citizens, the plebeians, gathered and watched the show, bringing picnics for the day-long event.

== Significance in Christianity ==
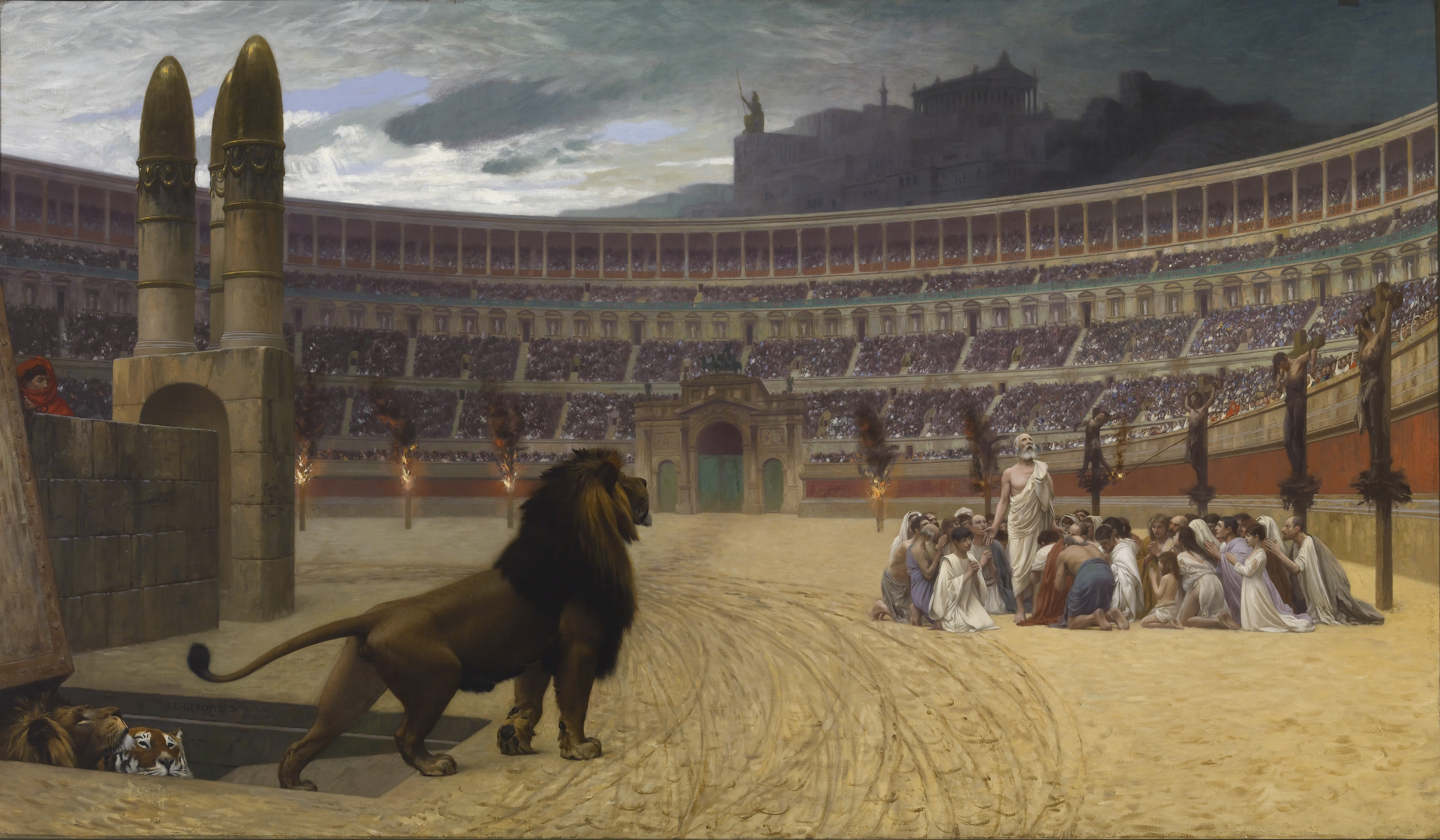
The Christian Martyrs' Last Prayer, by Jean-Léon Gérôme (1883)

The Colosseum is generally regarded by Christians as a site of the martyrdom of large numbers of believers during the persecution of Christians in the Roman Empire, as evidenced by Church history and tradition. On the other hand, other scholars believe that the majority of martyrdoms may have occurred at other venues within the city of Rome, rather than at the Colosseum, citing a lack of still-intact physical evidence or historical records. These scholars assert that "some Christians were executed as common criminals in the Colosseum—their crime being refusal to reverence the Roman gods", but most Christian martyrs of the early Church were executed for their faith at the Circus Maximus. According to Irenaeus (died about 202), Ignatius of Antioch was fed to the lions in Rome around 107 A.D. and although Irenaeus says nothing about this happening at the Colosseum, tradition ascribes it to that place.

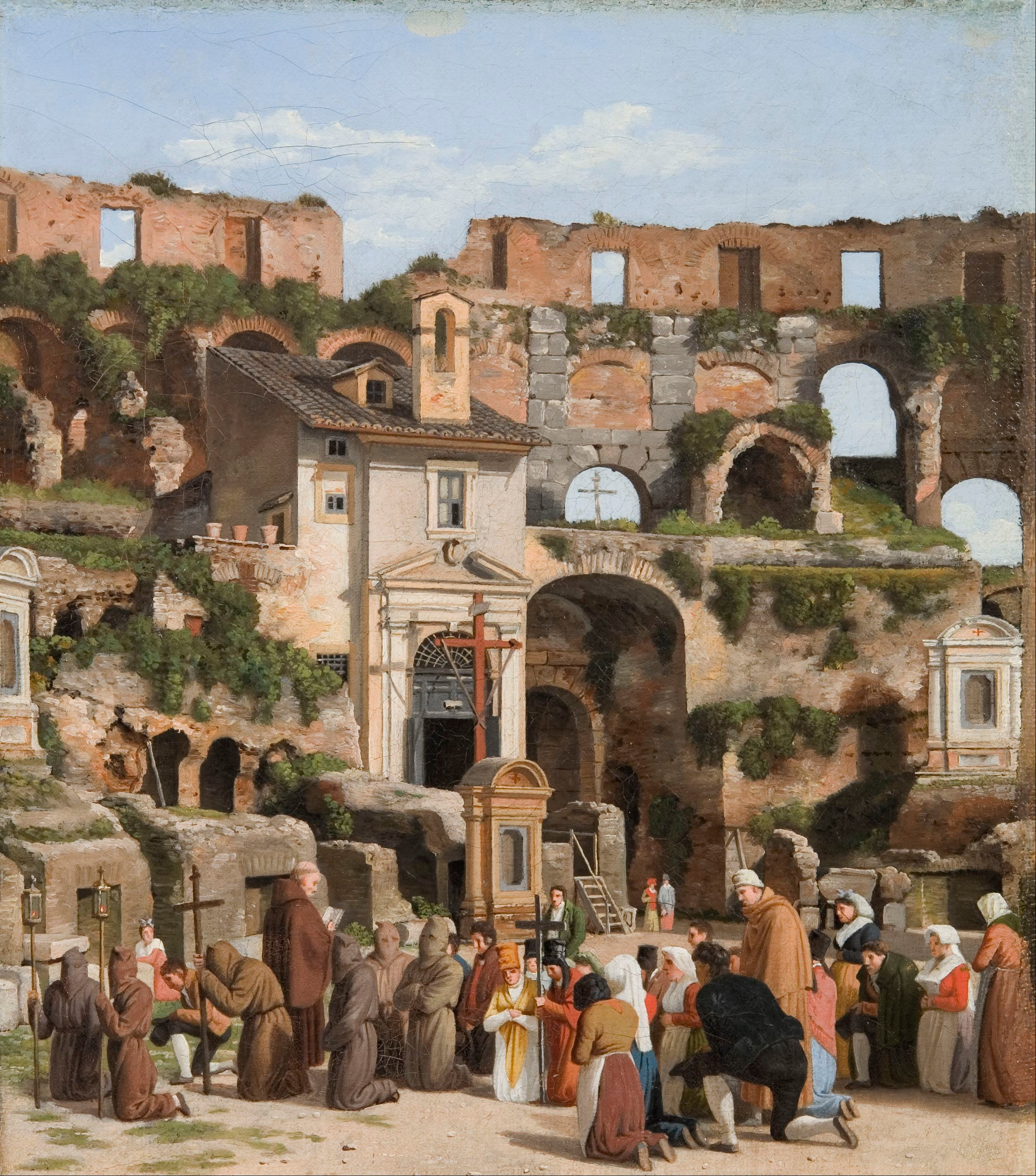
View of the interior of the Colosseum, by C. W. Eckersberg (1815)

In the Middle Ages, the Colosseum was not regarded as a monument, and was used as what some modern sources label a "quarry," which is to say that stones from the Colosseum were taken for the building of other sacred sites. This fact is used to support the idea that, at a time when sites associated with martyrs were highly venerated the Colosseum was not being treated as a sacred site. It was not included in the itineraries compiled for the use of pilgrims nor in works such as the 12th century Mirabilia Urbis Romae ("Marvels of the City of Rome"), which claims the Circus Flaminius – but not the Colosseum – as the site of martyrdoms. Part of the structure was inhabited by a Christian religious order, but it is not known whether this was for any particular religious reason.

Pope Pius V (1566–1572) is said to have recommended that pilgrims gather sand from the arena of the Colosseum to serve as a relic, on the grounds that it was impregnated with the blood of martyrs, although some of his contemporaries did not share his conviction. A century later Fioravante Martinelli listed the Colosseum at the head of a list of places sacred to the martyrs in his 1653 book Roma ex ethnica sacra. Martinelli's book evidently had an effect on public opinion; in response to Cardinal Altieri's proposal some years later to turn the Colosseum into a bullring, Carlo Tomassi published a pamphlet in protest against what he regarded as an act of desecration. The ensuing controversy persuaded Pope Clement X to close the Colosseum's external arcades and declare it a sanctuary.

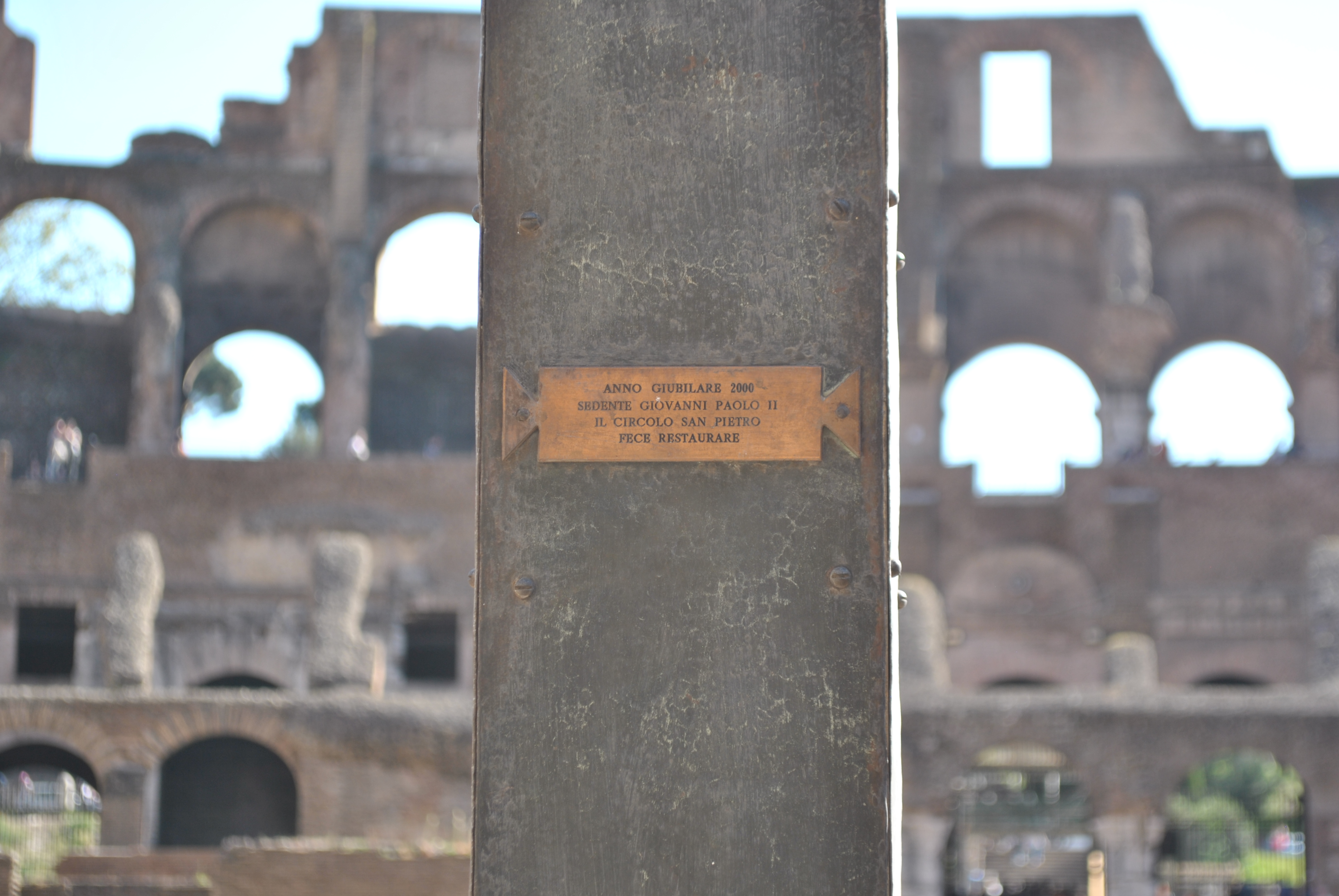
Cross dedicated to the Christian martyrs, placed in 2000 by Pope John Paul II.

At the insistence of St. Leonard of Port Maurice, Pope Benedict XIV (1740–1758) forbade the quarrying of the Colosseum and erected Stations of the Cross around the arena, which remained until February 1874. Benedict Joseph Labre spent the later years of his life within the walls of the Colosseum, living on alms, before he died in 1783. Several 19th century popes funded repair and restoration work on the Colosseum, and it still retains its Christian connection today. A Christian cross stands in the Colosseum, with a plaque, stating:

The amphitheater, one consecrated to triumphs, entertainments, and the impious worship of pagan gods, is now dedicated to the sufferings of the martyrs purified from impious superstitions.

Other Christian crosses stand in several points around the arena and every Good Friday the Pope leads a Via Crucis procession to the amphitheater.

== Flora ==
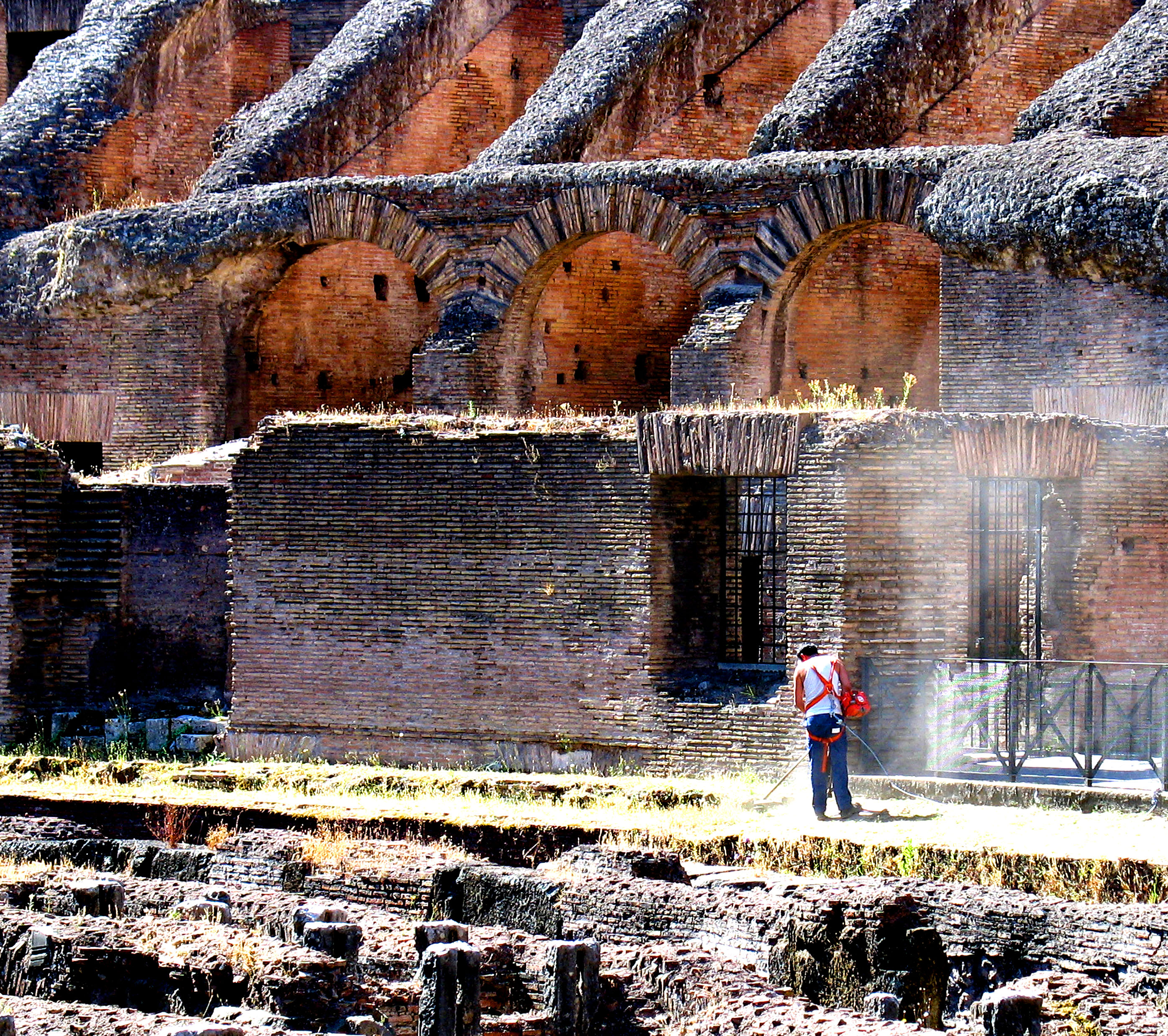
Weed control

The flora of the Colosseum has been repeatedly documented ever since Domenico Panaroli made the first catalogue of its vascular plants in 1643. Since then, 684 different species have been recorded there. The highest diversity was in 1855, when doctor and amateur botanist Richard Deakin listed 418 species, including some found nowhere else in Europe. Attempts were made in 1871 to eradicate the vegetation because of concerns over damage to the masonry, but much has returned. Two hundred and forty-two species have been counted most recently, and of the species first identified by Panaroli only 200 remain.

The diversity and change in plant species can be explained by the changing climate of Italy through the centuries, as well as by bird migration, flower blooming, and the growth of Rome that changed the Colosseum's site from the outskirts the ancient city to being embedded in a modern urban centre. Deliberate import of animal species is another contributing cause, as seeds were unwittingly carried either on the fur or in the feces of animals brought there from all corners of the empire.

== In popular culture ==
The Colosseum has appeared in numerous films, series, artworks and games. It is featured in films such as Roman Holiday, Gladiator, The Way of the Dragon, Jumper, and Godzilla x Kong: The New Empire. Additionally, Coliseum Mountain in Alberta, Canada was named after the Colosseum. It is also a prelavent location in JoJo's Bizarre Adventure Part 5: Vento Aureo.

Several architectural works have also been modelled on or inspired by, the Colosseum. These include:

- The Kongresshalle, or "Congress Hall", (1935, unfinished) at the Nazi Party Rally grounds, Nuremberg, Germany
- The Summer Olympic Games medal from 1928 to 2000, designed by Giuseppe Cassioli, features a depiction of the Colosseum. At the 2004 Summer Olympics in Athens the Colosseum was replaced by a depiction of the Panathinaiko Stadium
- The exterior of the Vancouver Public Library in British Columbia resembles the current state of the Colosseum. It was designed by Moshe Safdie.
- The Los Angeles Memorial Coliseum entrance was inspired by the Colosseum.
- The Palazzo della Civiltà Italiana was very closely modelled on the Colosseum. It was built for Mussolini for the Universal Exhibition of 1942 but the exhibition never happened due to the outbreak of World War II. The architects were Giovanni Guerrini, Ernesto Lapadula, and Mario Romano.
- McCaig's Tower, overlooking Oban, Scotland.

== Gallery ==
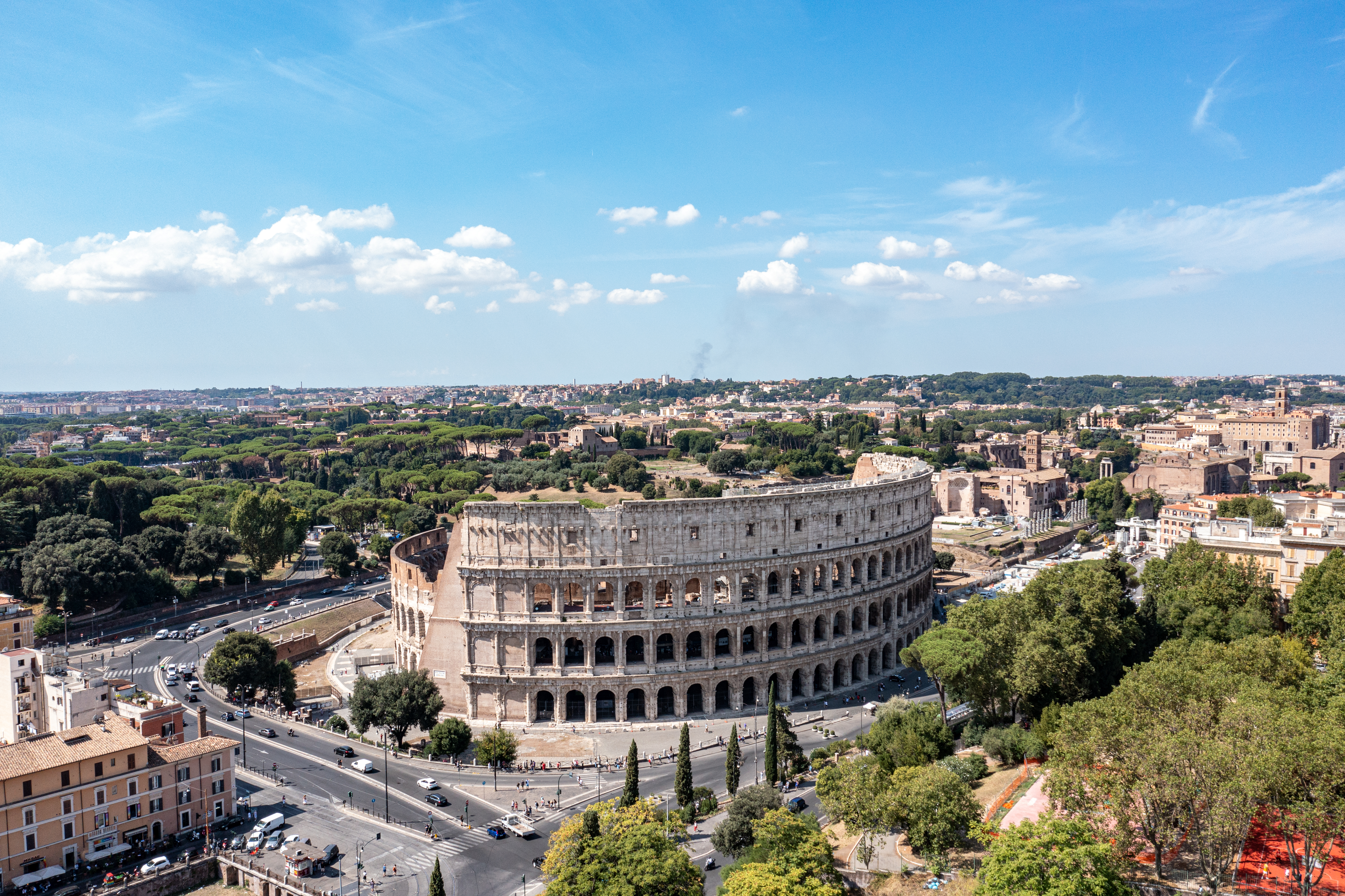
The Colosseum in 2021

The Colosseum and the Arch of Constantine, seen from Palatine Hill

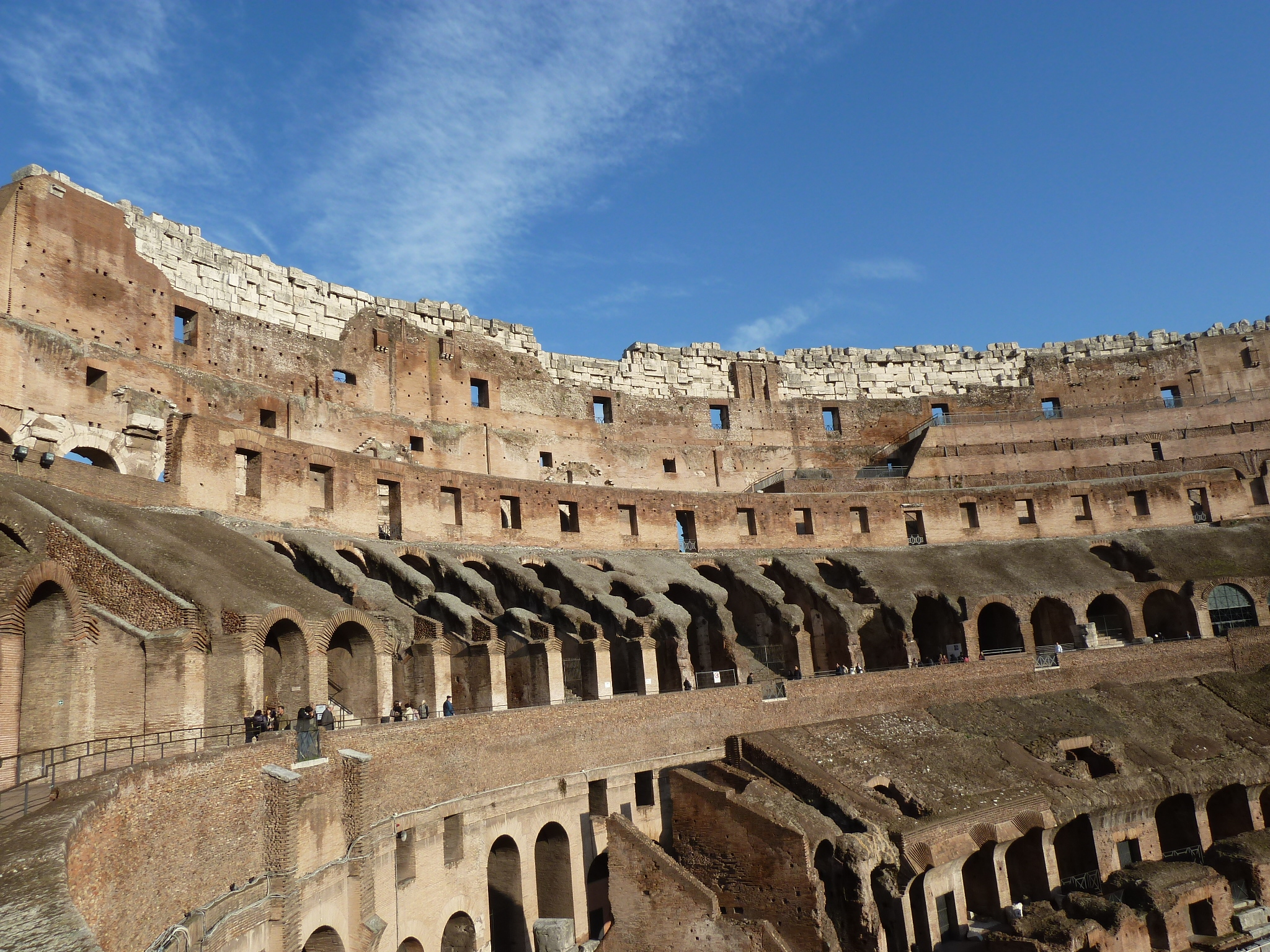
Interior

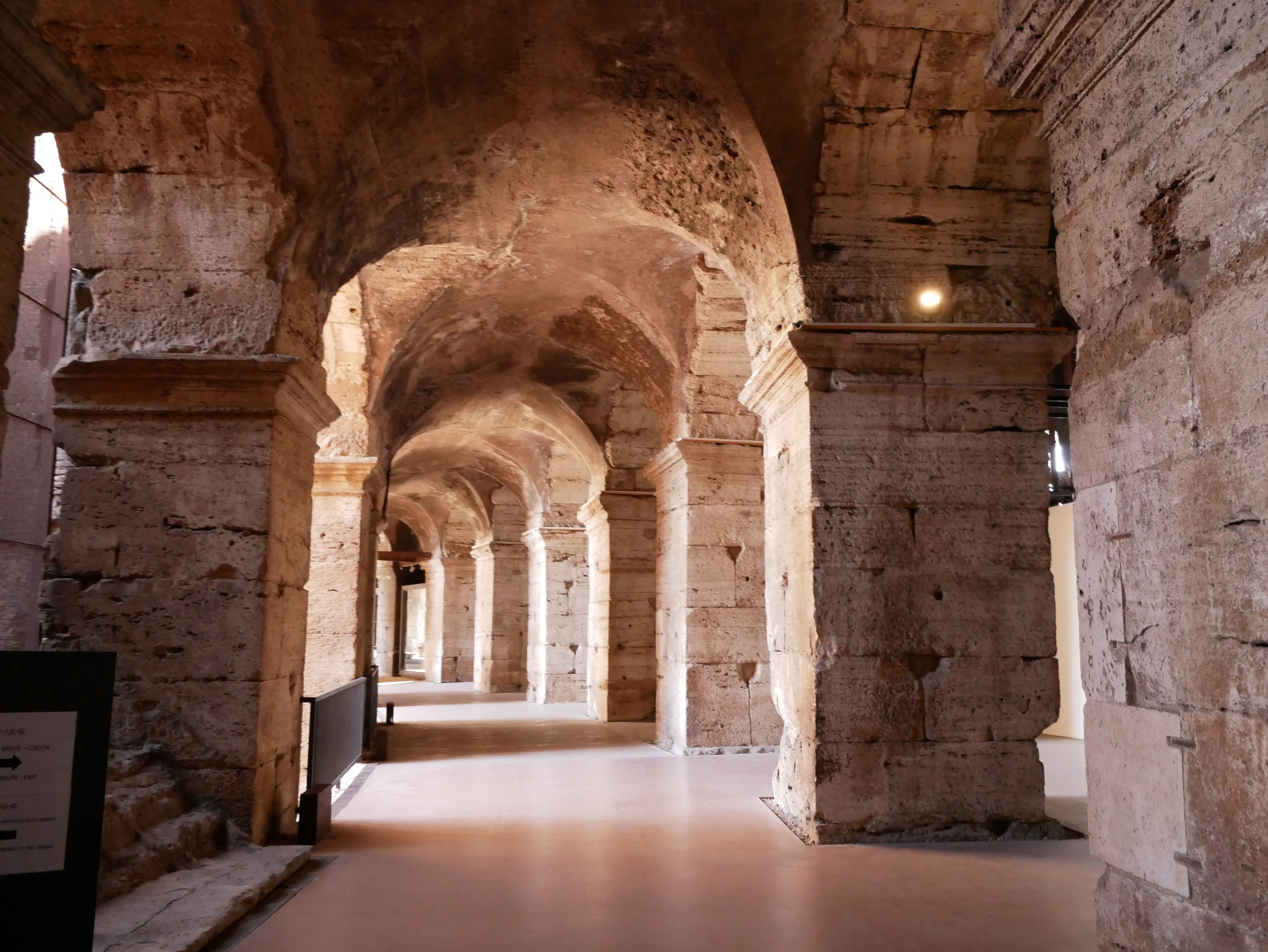
Interior

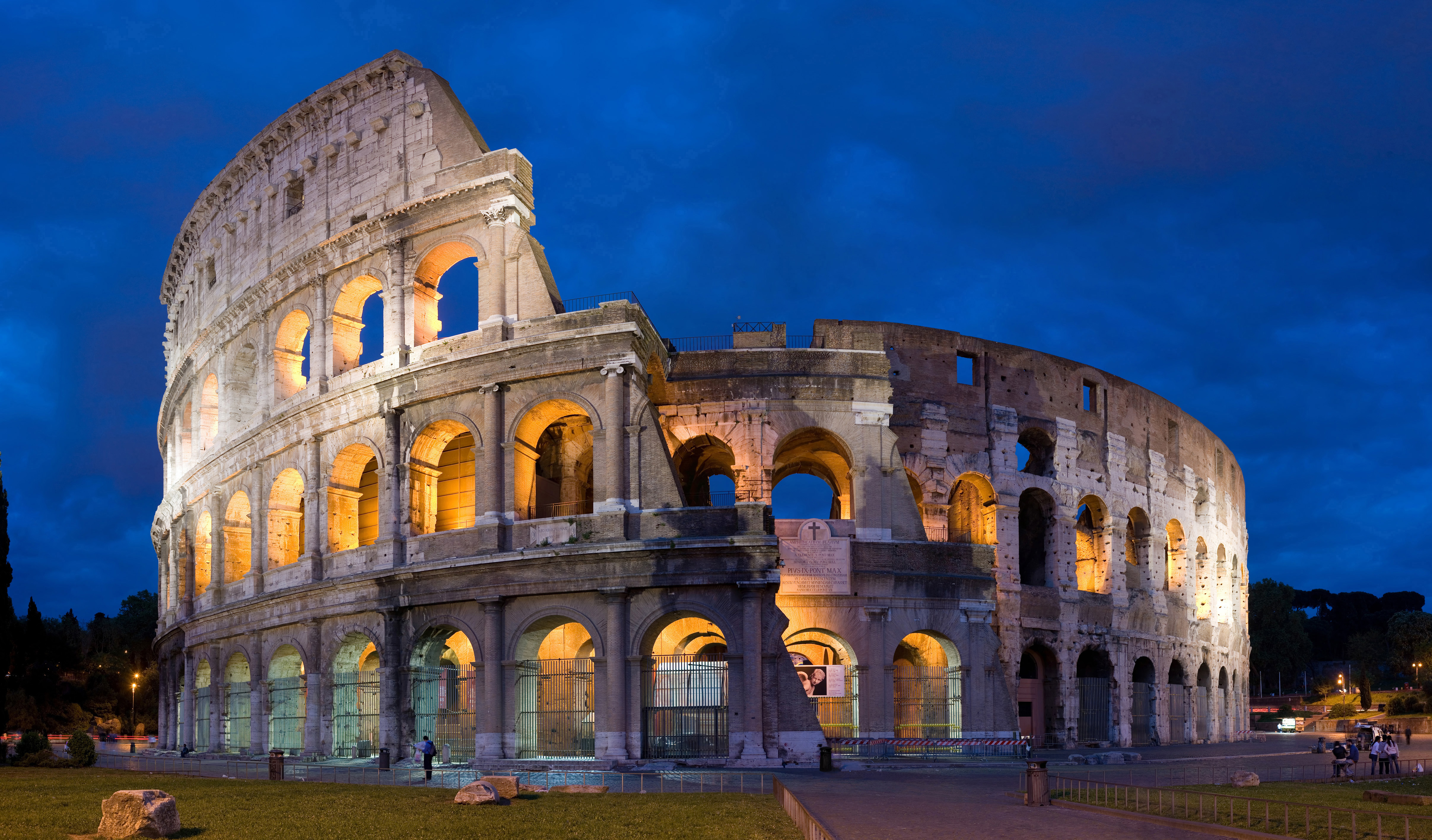
The Colosseum at night

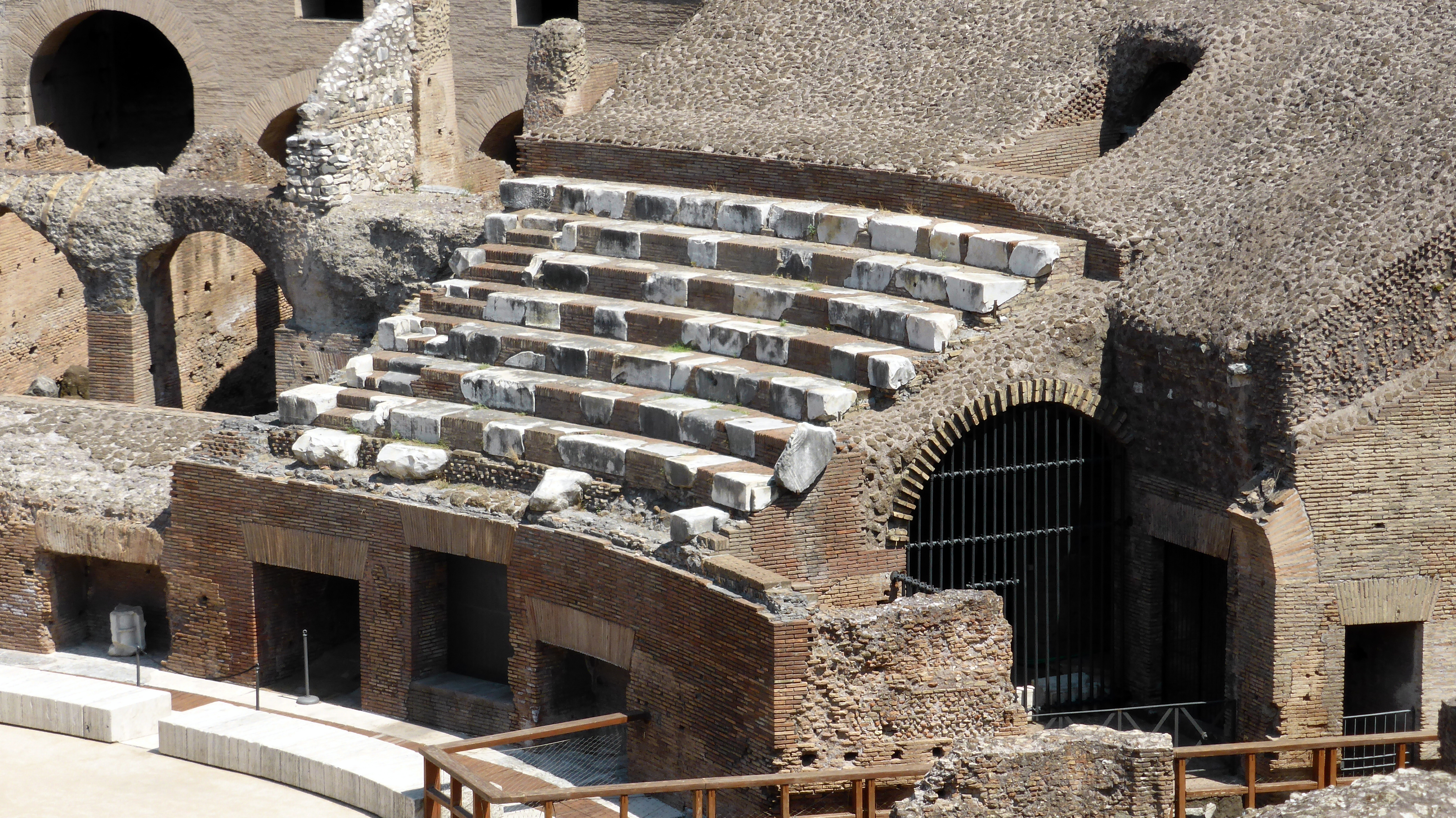
Seating tiers at the east entrance

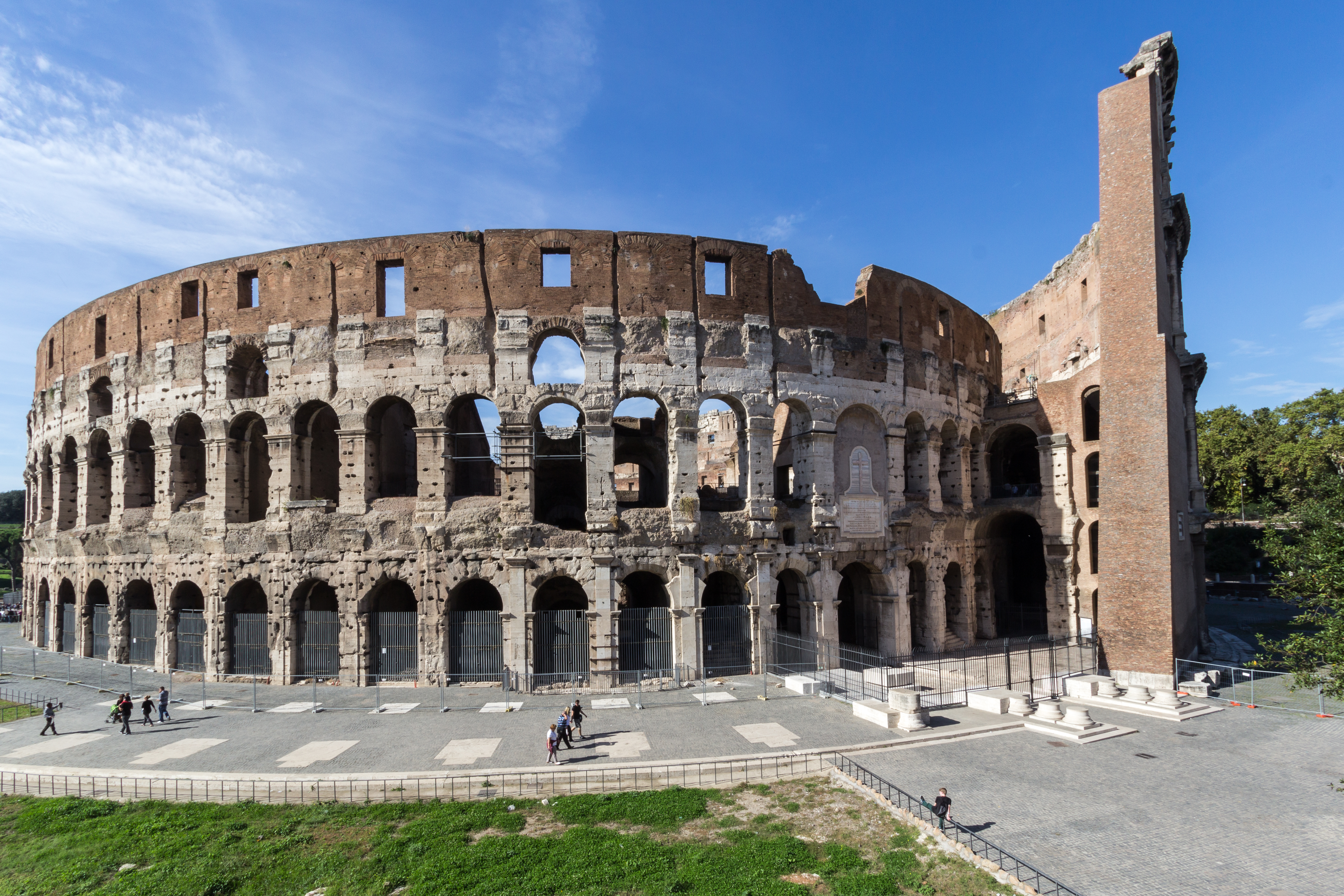
The Colosseum in 2013

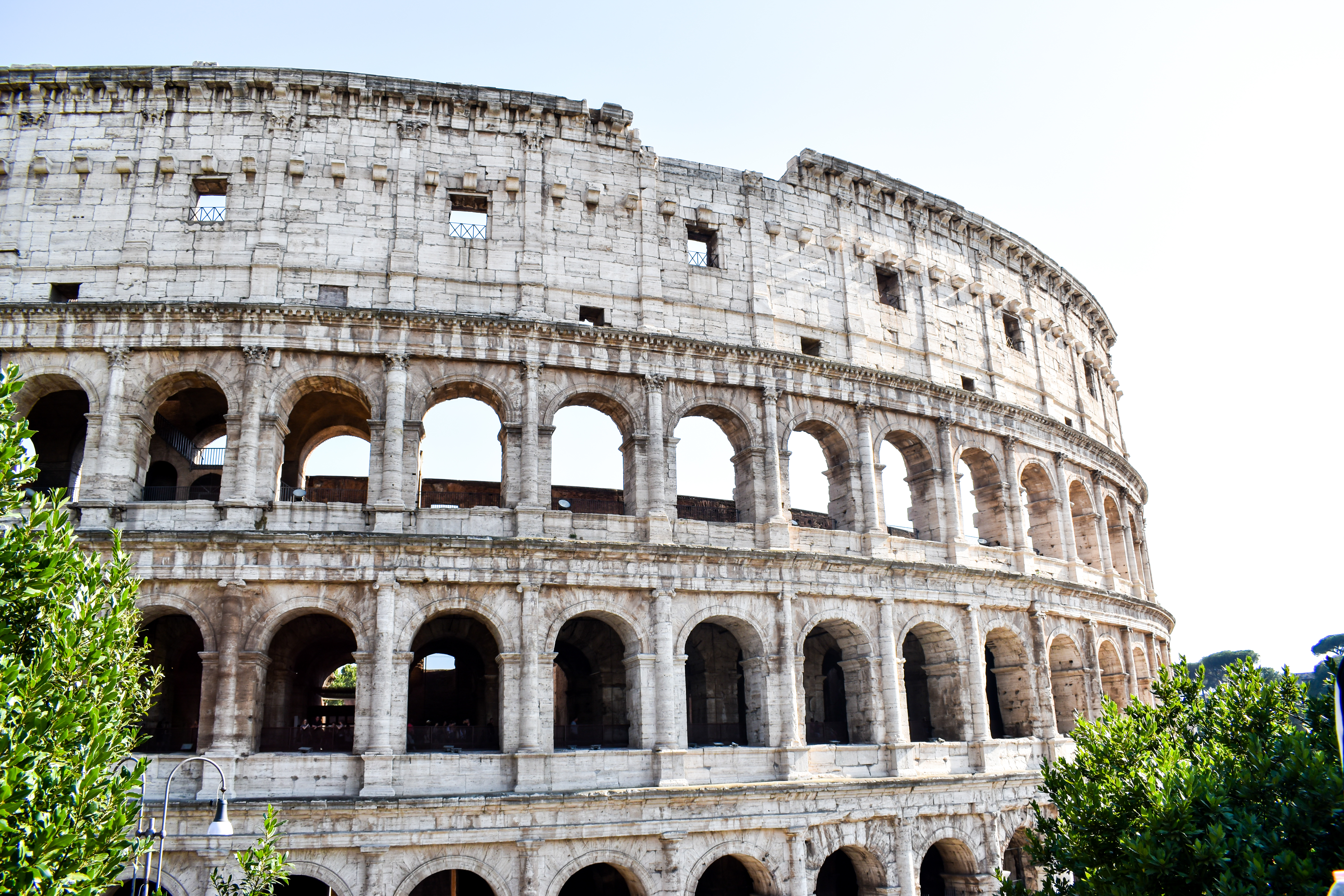
The Colosseum viewed from Via Nicola Salvi in 2023

== See also ==
- List of Roman amphitheatres
- List of tallest structures built before the 20th century
- List of tourist attractions in Rome
- Roman amphitheatre – Ancient Roman open-air venues
- Stadium of Domitian – Ancient Roman stadium, a landmark of Rome, Italy

Preceded by Circus of Nero	Landmarks of Rome; Colosseum	Succeeded by Ludus Magnus
