= Domenico Panaroli =

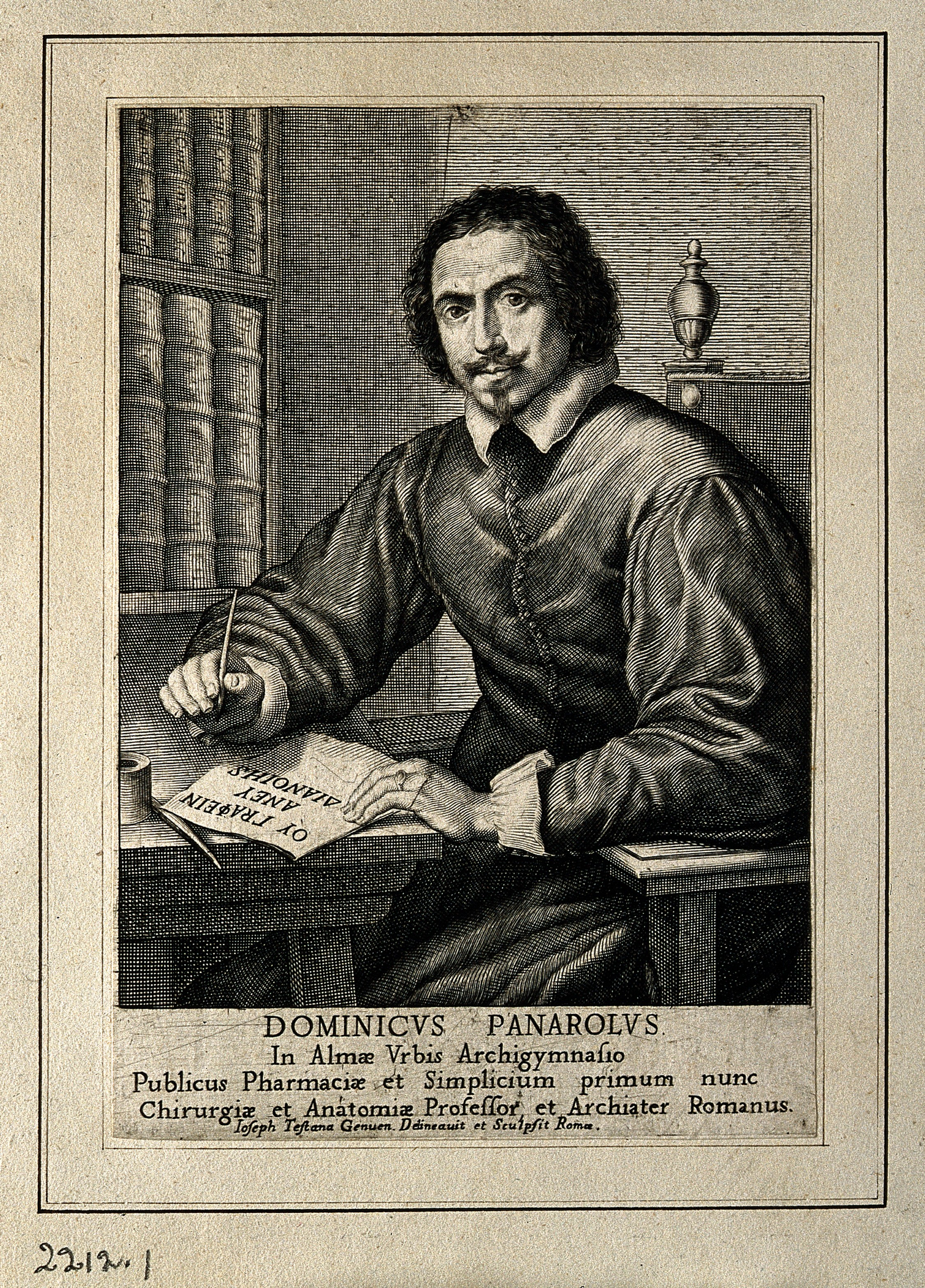
Portrait. Credit: Wellcome Library

Domenico Panaroli (1587–1657) was a physician and herbalist of Rome. He is remembered today largely by what was for him a minor work. In 1643 he compiled the first Flora of the Colosseum, Plantarum Amphytheatralium Catalogus, where he had noticed many exotic species were naturalized, originally from stowaway seeds that hitch-hiked in bedding straw and in animals' coats, or that had come in more recently, for in the 17th century the Colosseum was full of improvised shelter that housed people and workshops, a den of thieves in the eyes of outsiders (Caneva 2003).

A street is named for Panaroli, in Rome's Rione VII.

- Giulia Caneva, "The Colosseum's use and state of abandonment as analysed through its flora" in International Biodeterioration & Biodegradation 51, pp211–219, April 2003)
- "Pflanzen verraten Geschichte des Kolosseums" "Plants tell the history of the Colosseum" (in German)
