= Walls of Babylon =

City walls of ancient Babylon

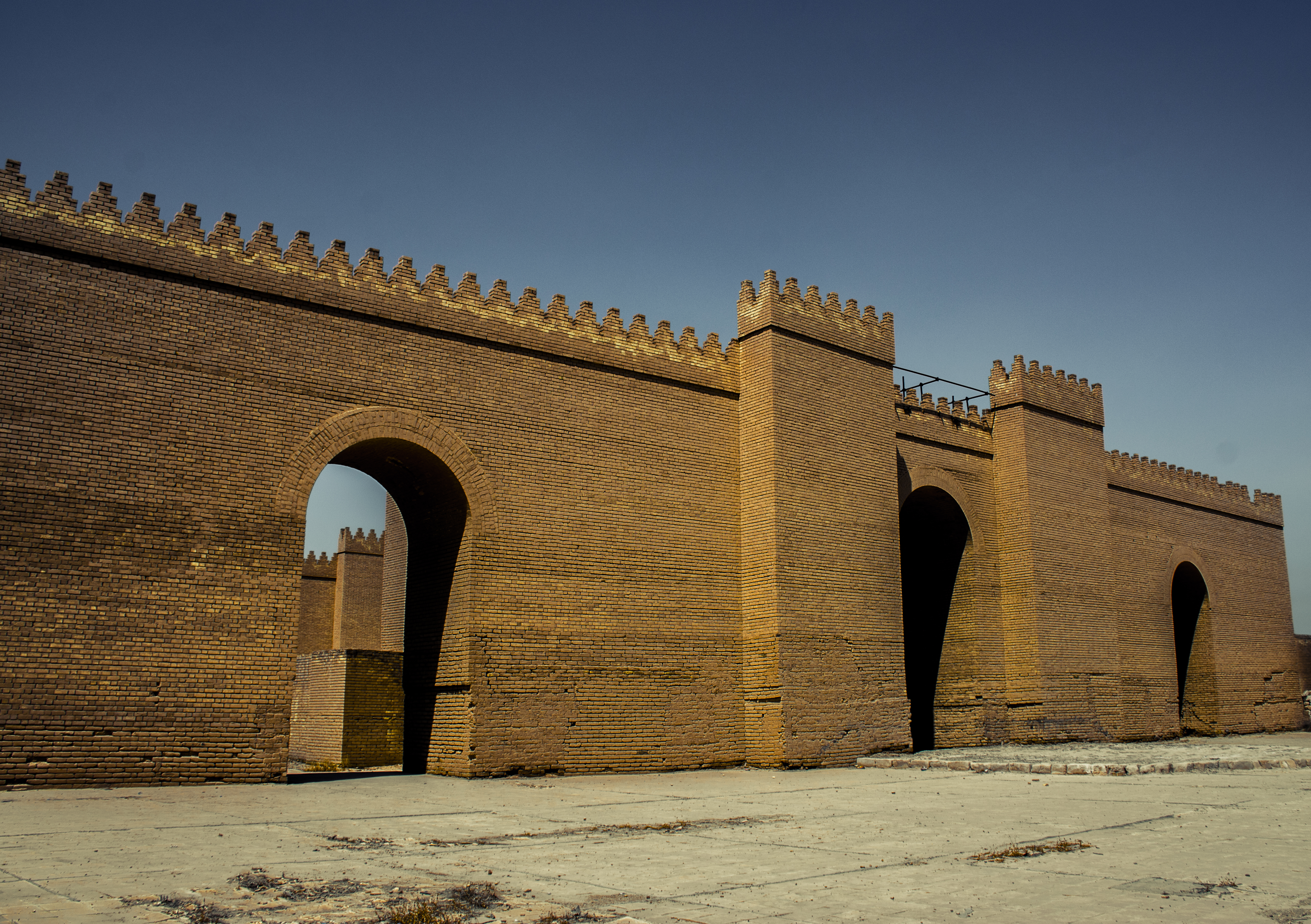
- Reconstruction of the walls, Babylon

- Location within Iraq
- 32.54255°N 44.41949°E
- Location: Hillah, Babylon Governorate, Iraq

The walls of Babylon were the city walls surrounding the ancient Mesopotamian city of Babylon, the political and religious centre of the Neo-Babylonian Empire.

The walls of Babylon were included in many early versions of the Seven Wonders of the Ancient World. In a study of the original sources for the Seven Wonders, Wilhelm Heinrich Roscher found that they were the second-most frequently chosen, with only the Colossus of Rhodes being chosen more frequently. Ancient writers such as Herodotus, Strabo, and the author of the Book of Jeremiah described them.

They were by far the largest structures in Babylon; the German archeological team led by Robert Koldewey estimated their height to be 12-24m and their thickness to be 17-22m.

Today, the remains of Babylon are the best-understood topographically of all known cities from the 1st millennium BC, due to the city walls being visible as earthworks even prior to the first excavations in 1899.

== Ancient descriptions ==
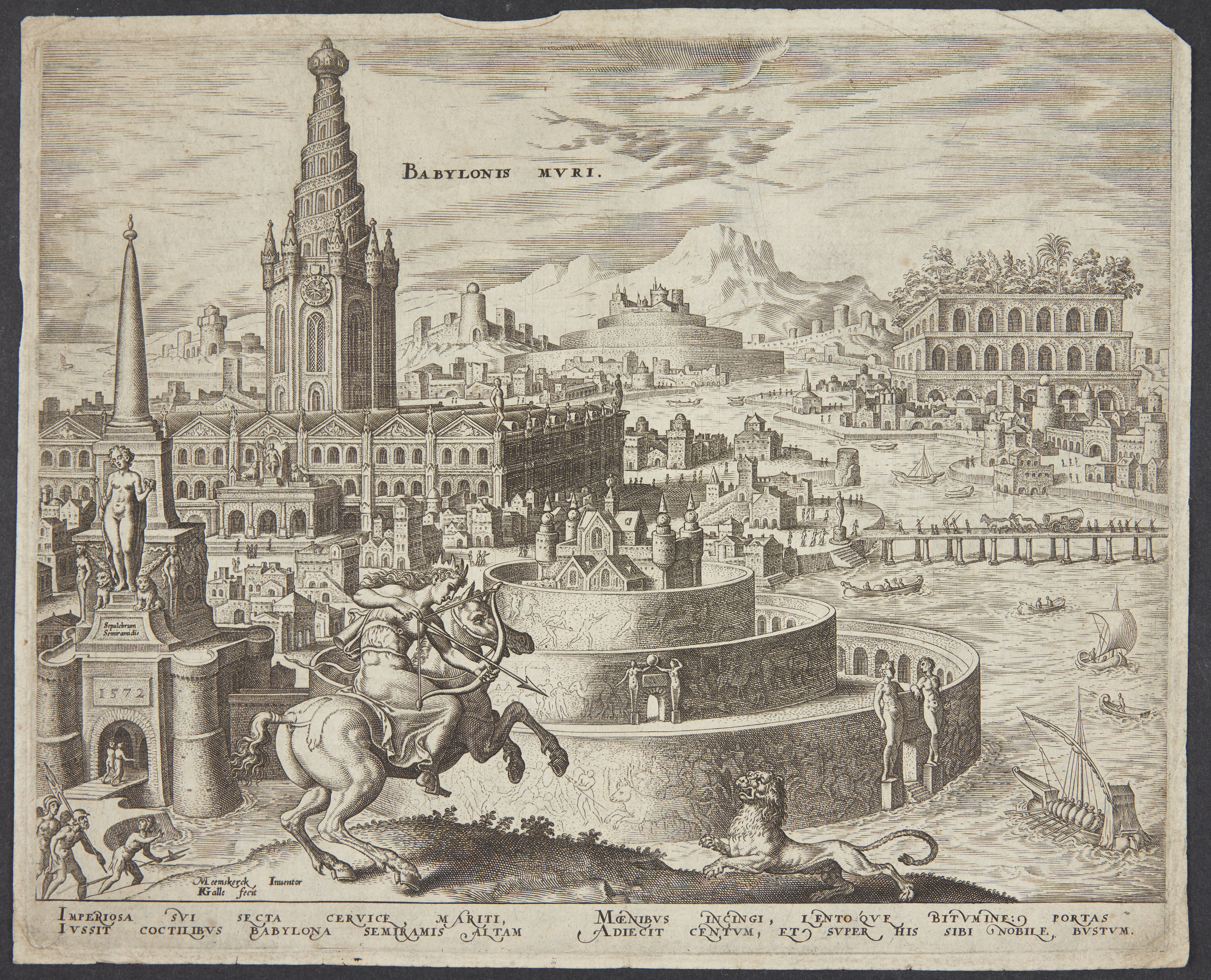
Octo Mundi Miracula: "Babylonis Muri" (Babylon Walls), 1572

The historian Herodotus wrote a detailed description of the walls in Histories, stating that the walls formed a square measuring 120 stades on each side (c. 22 km or 14 mi), with a total circuit of 480 stades (c. 86 km or 53 mi), 50 royal cubits thick (c. 24 m or 79 ft) and 200 cubits high (c. 97 m or 318 ft), built of baked brick bonded with bitumen.

Later classical writers largely repeated Herodotus. Strabo in Geography XVI 1.5 emphasised the city's rectangular plan and colossal perimeter, while Diodorus Siculus and Quintus Curtius Rufus transmitted variants of the same tradition. In the Bible, Jeremiah 51 verse 58 mentions the walls: "Babylon's thick wall will be leveled, and her high gates set on fire."

== History ==
The walls are thought to have been first built in the early second millennium BC, with cuneiform tablets mentioning members of the Hammurabi dynasty, including his son Samsu-iluna, referring to the construction or rebuilding of city walls, gates and moats.

In the mid-first millennium BC, Nabopolassar built or rebuilt two walls – mudbrick walls and baked-brick embankments – named Imgur-Enlil and Nēmet-Enlil. His son Nebuchadnezzar II expanded the walls subsequently, doubling their size.

Nebuchadnezzar II's inner wall (Imgur-Enlil) was made of baked brick in bitumen mortar, and his outer wall (Nēmet-Enlil) consisting of a massive mudbrick rampart. A moat, fed from the Euphrates river, was built in between the two walls.

Written and archaeological evidence shows that the fortifications remained in use and under repair into the Hellenistic and even the Parthian periods, contradicting Herodotus' notion of a single "Chaldean" monument. However, Herodotus' account exerted a formative influence on the interpretation of the walls' ruins from the 19th century onward.

== Archaeology, current status and reconstruction ==
=== Archaeology ===
The first systematic excavations were led by German archaeologist Robert Koldewey between 1899 and 1917. Koldewey excavated a number of stretches of the wall system in depth, while other sections were only mapped at surface level or recorded as visible ridges. Archaeological evidence for the upper parts of Babylon's walls and gates was and remains limited.

Later Iraqi excavations, first in 1938 and later in the late 1970s and 1980s, investigated the Ishtar Gate complex and the eastern inner city wall, including the Marduk and Zababa Gates. The later campaigns introduced substantial restorations and reconstructions.

=== Current status ===
Today, extensive unexcavated portions of the walls remain visible, including partly excavated mudbrick walls between the palaces, and lower levels of the Ishtar Gate showing baked brick with relief decoration. Some sections of the walls have been damaged or removed by illegal modern construction, notably in the northwest of the western city, where satellite imagery from the 1960s recorded walls that have since largely disappeared.

=== Reconstructions ===
Following the excavations, several full-scale reconstructions of Babylonian walls and gates were created both in Berlin and in Babylon itself.

In Berlin, the Pergamon Museum houses reconstructions of the lower northern façade of the Ishtar Gate and sections of the Processional Way. Much of these structures had been taken apart by brick miners in the pre-modern era. The reconstructions incorporate a mixture of original glazed brick fragments recovered from the site and modern bricks manufactured in the 1920s; approximately 80% of the visible surface is modern.

In Babylon, major reconstructions were undertaken in the late 1970s and early 1980s, all of which were along the eastern inner city wall. These include the rebuilt inner gate of the Marduk Gate, sections of the mudbrick city wall given reconstructed inner façades, and partial reconstructions around the Ishtar Gate. In several cases, baked brick was used instead of the original unbaked mudbrick to ensure durability. About 180 m of wall flanking the Processional Way north of the Ishtar Gate were reconstructed, according to the interpretations of the German excavators, to illustrate the presumed relationship between the street levels and the surrounding walls, although this arrangement has not been conclusively demonstrated archaeologically. A half-scale modern copy of the Ishtar Gate, erected in Babylon in 1958–1959, stands apart from the ancient remains and has served as a prominent touristic and national symbol of Iraq.

== Gallery ==
=== Maps ===
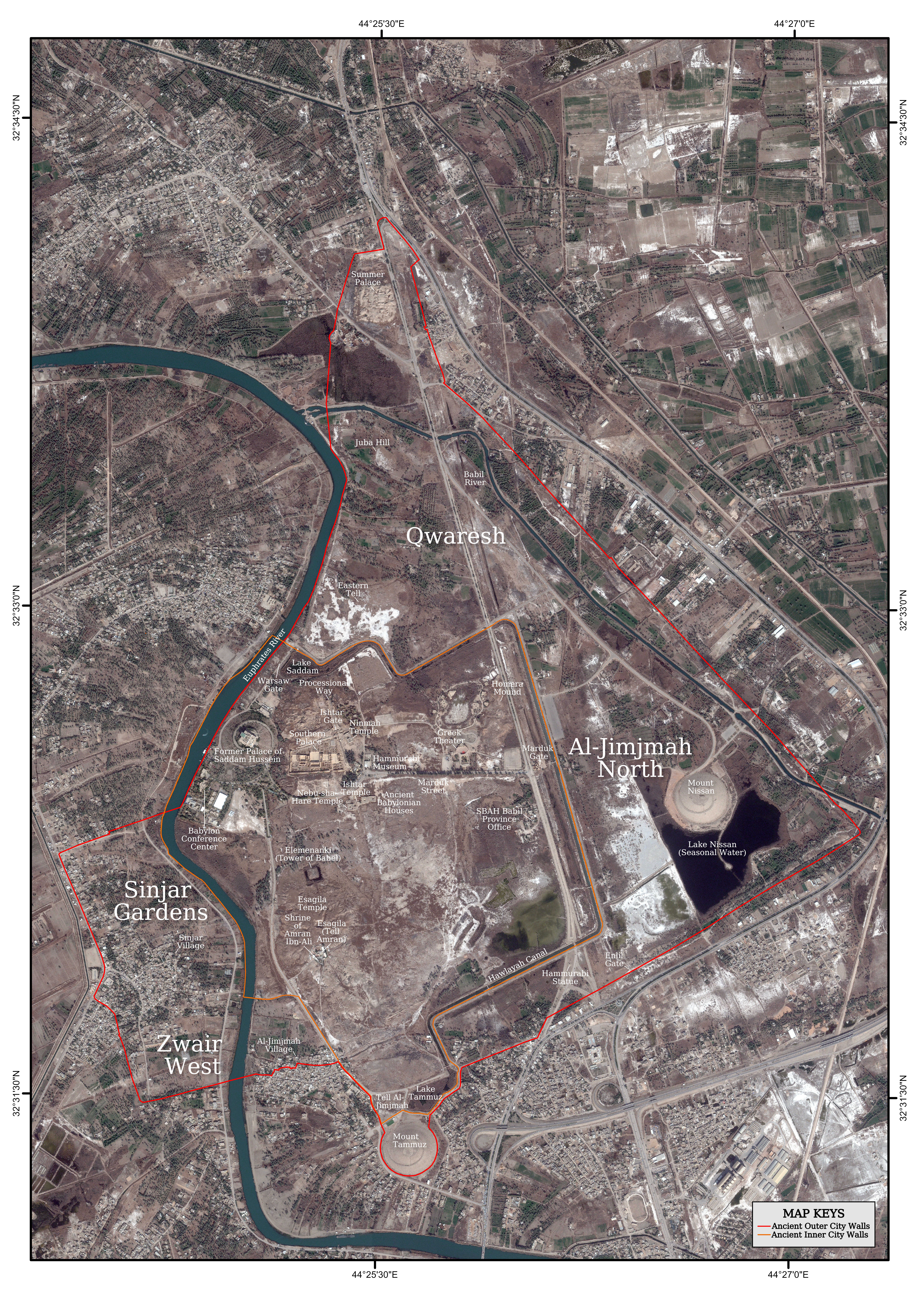
Map of Babylon showing the walls

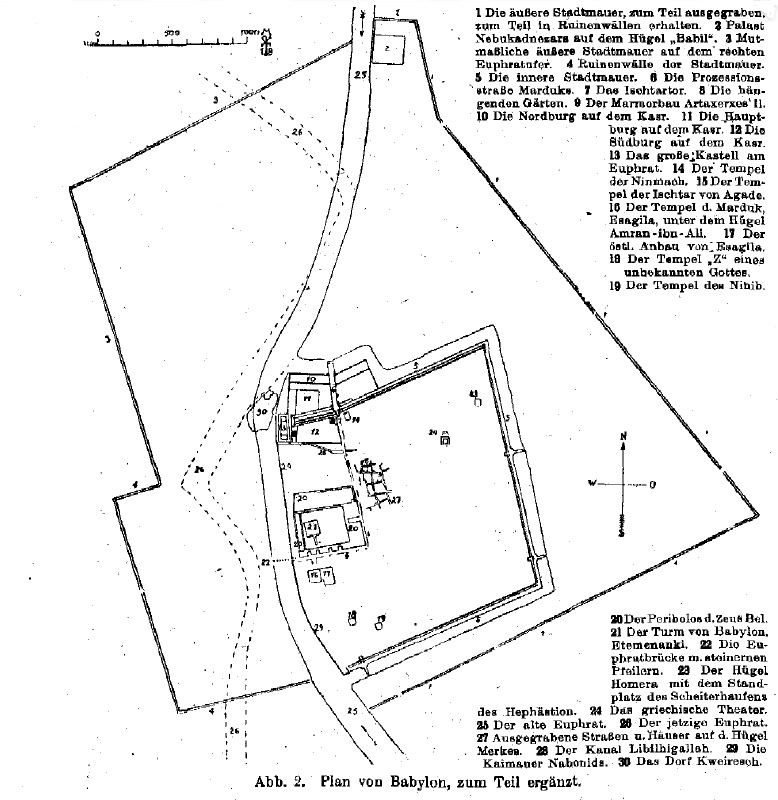
Robert Koldewey's 1919 plan of the walls

=== Archaeology ===
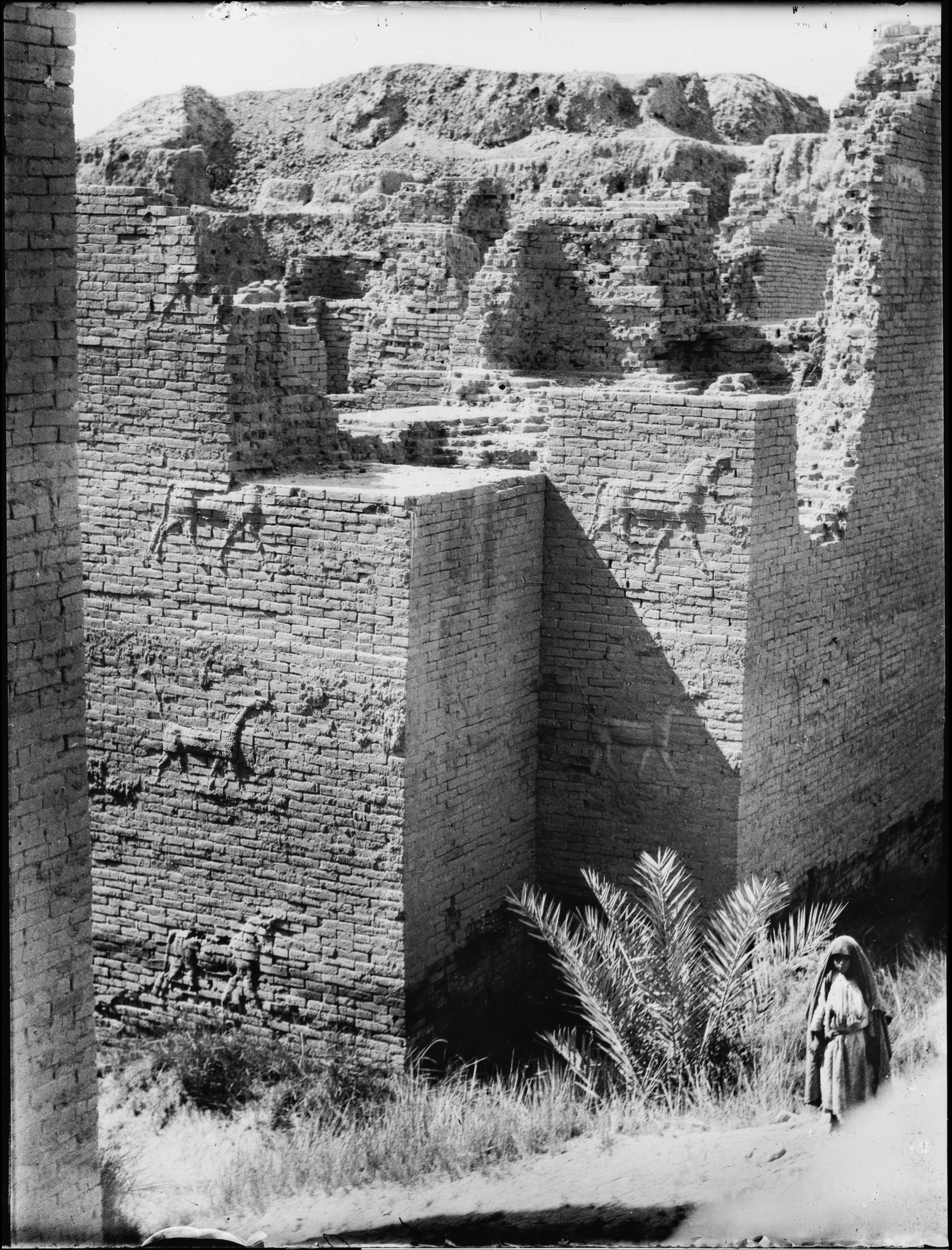
1932

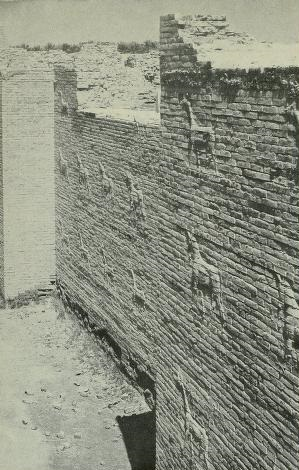
1959

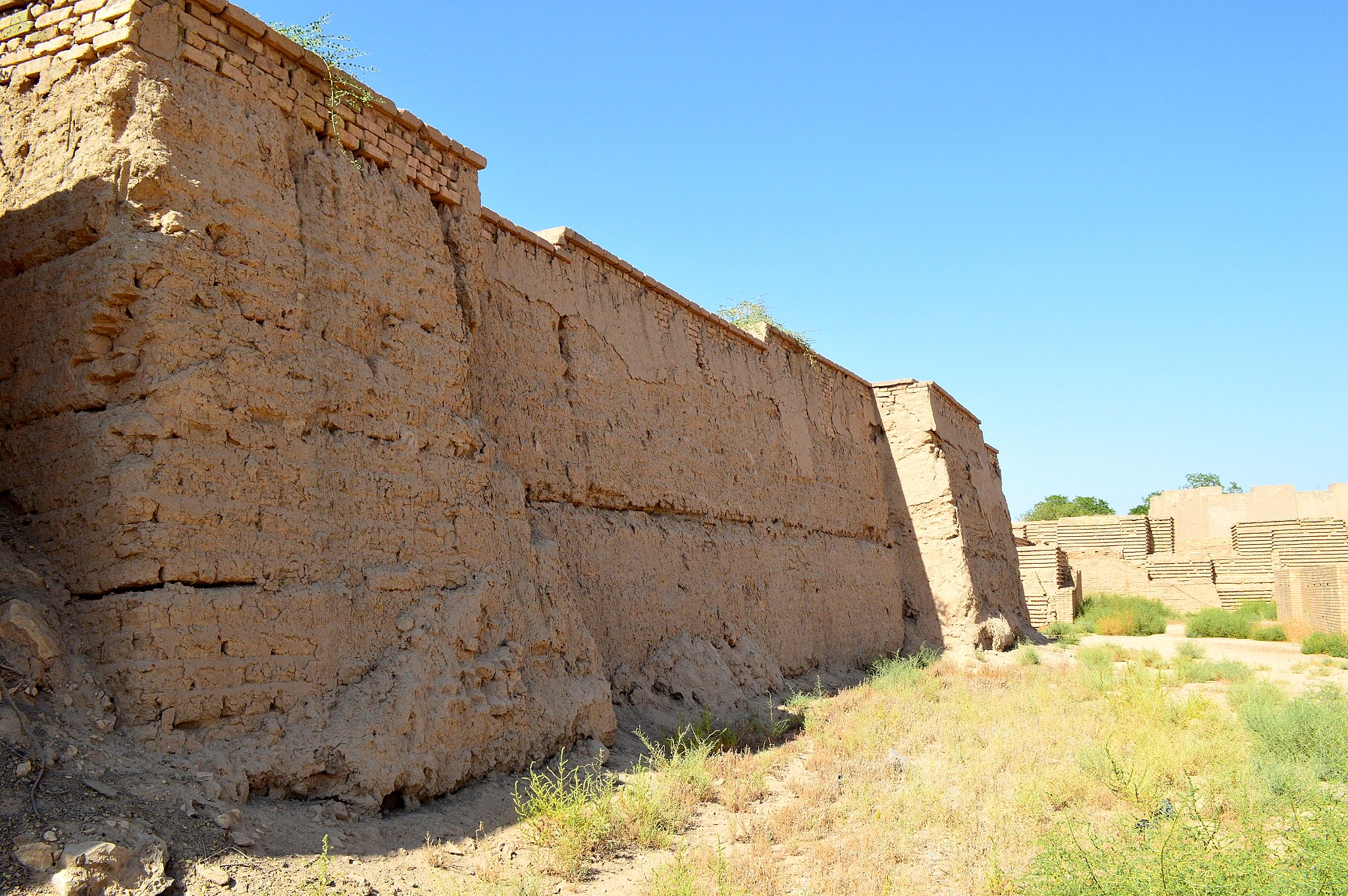
Inner walls, 2012

=== Reconstructions ===
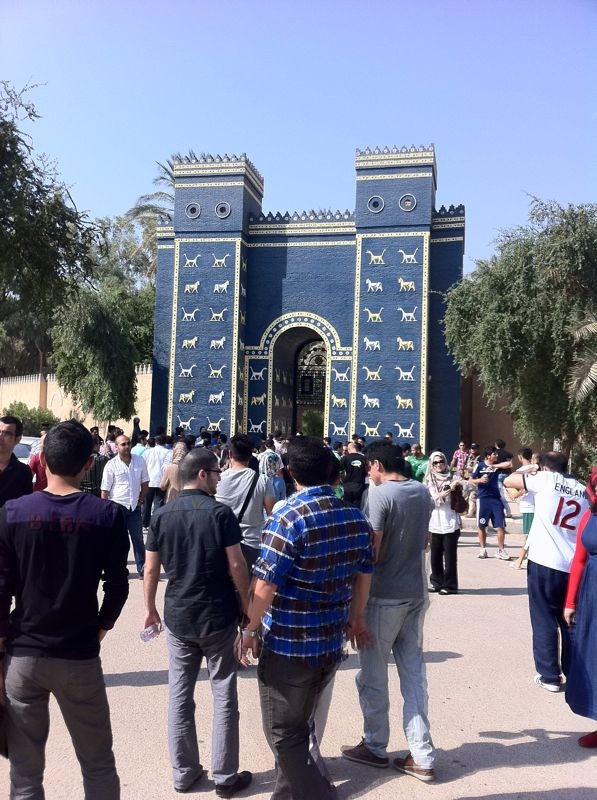
Ishtar Gate reconstruction in Babylon

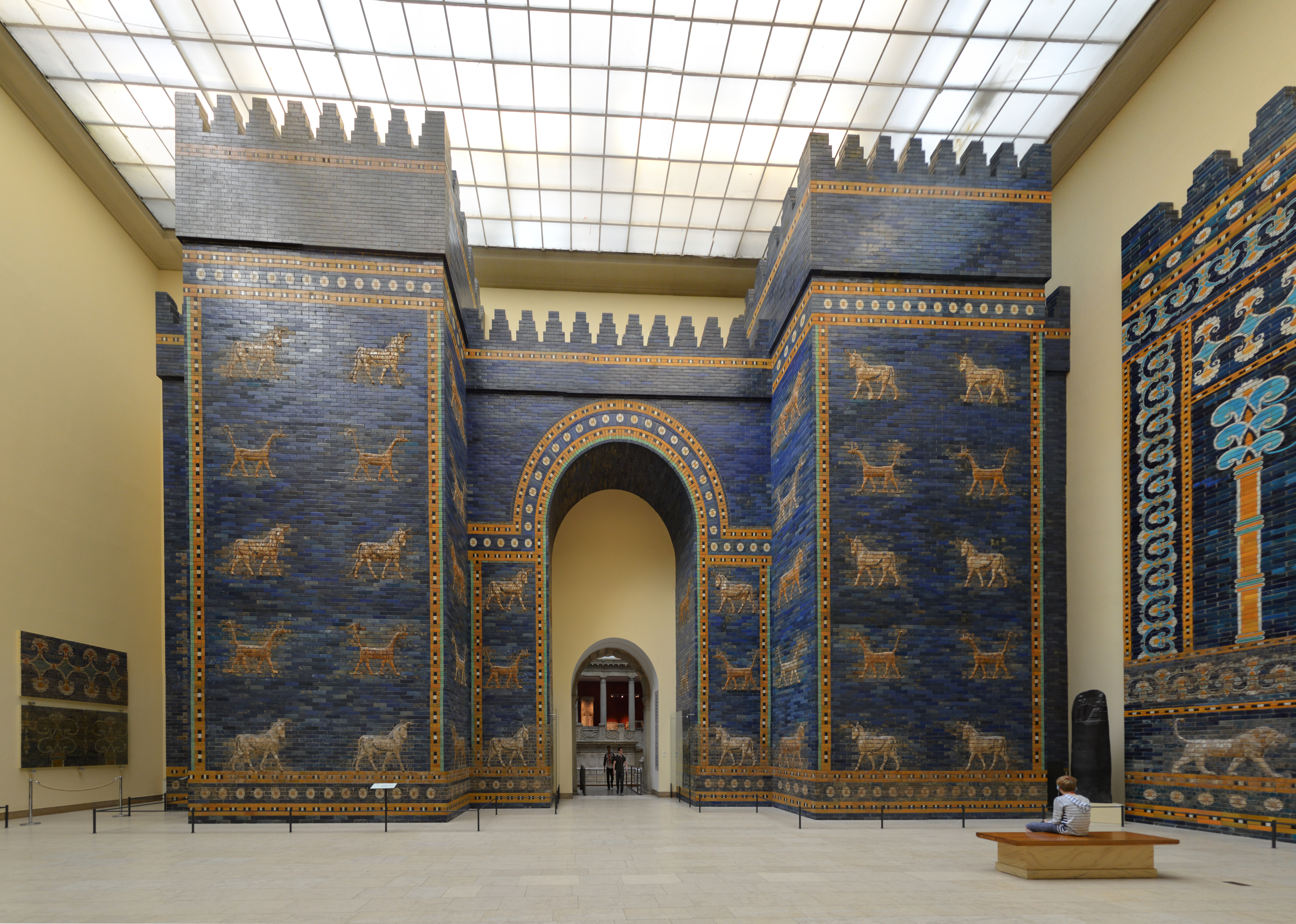
Ishtar Gate reconstruction in Berlin

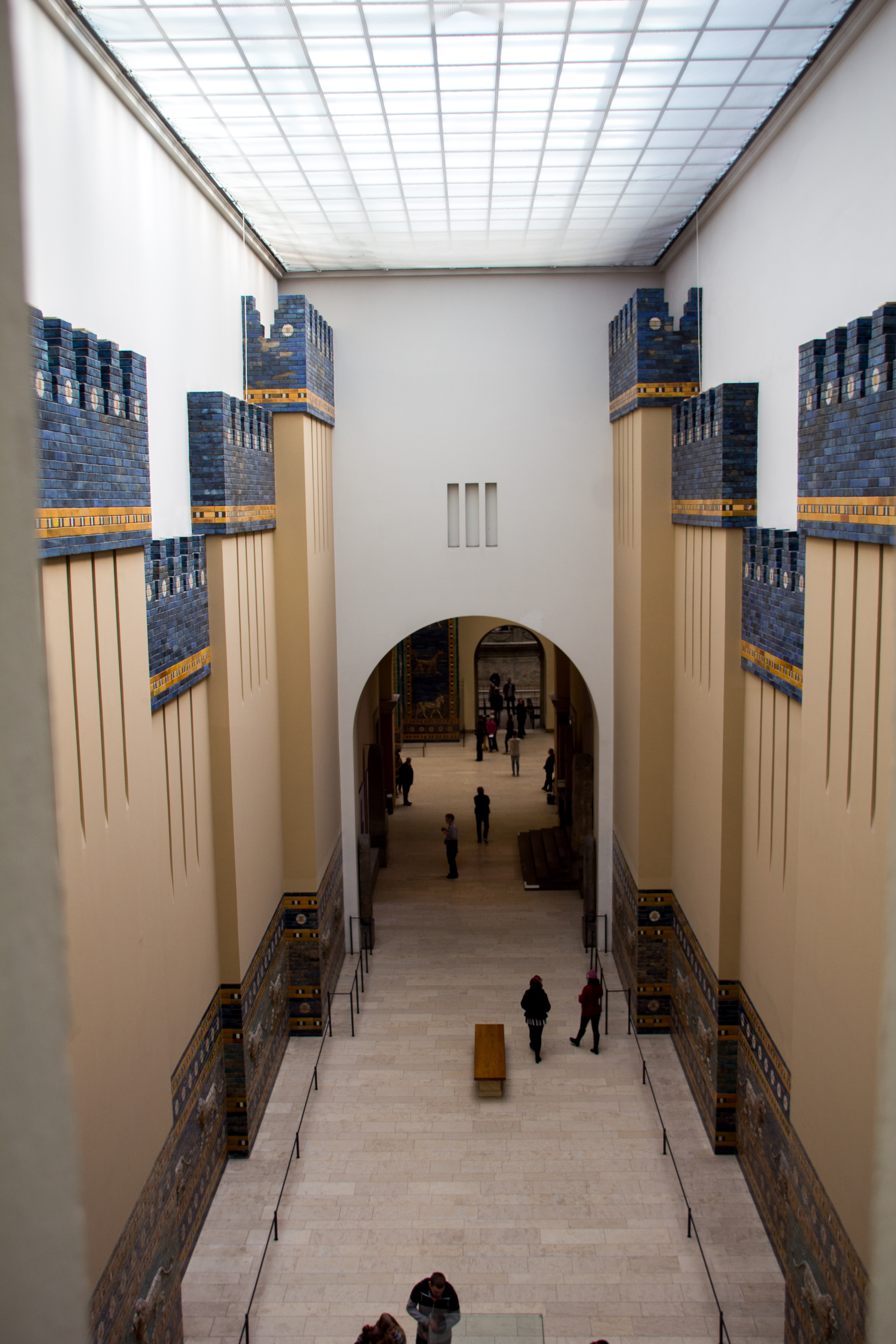
Processional Way reconstruction in Berlin

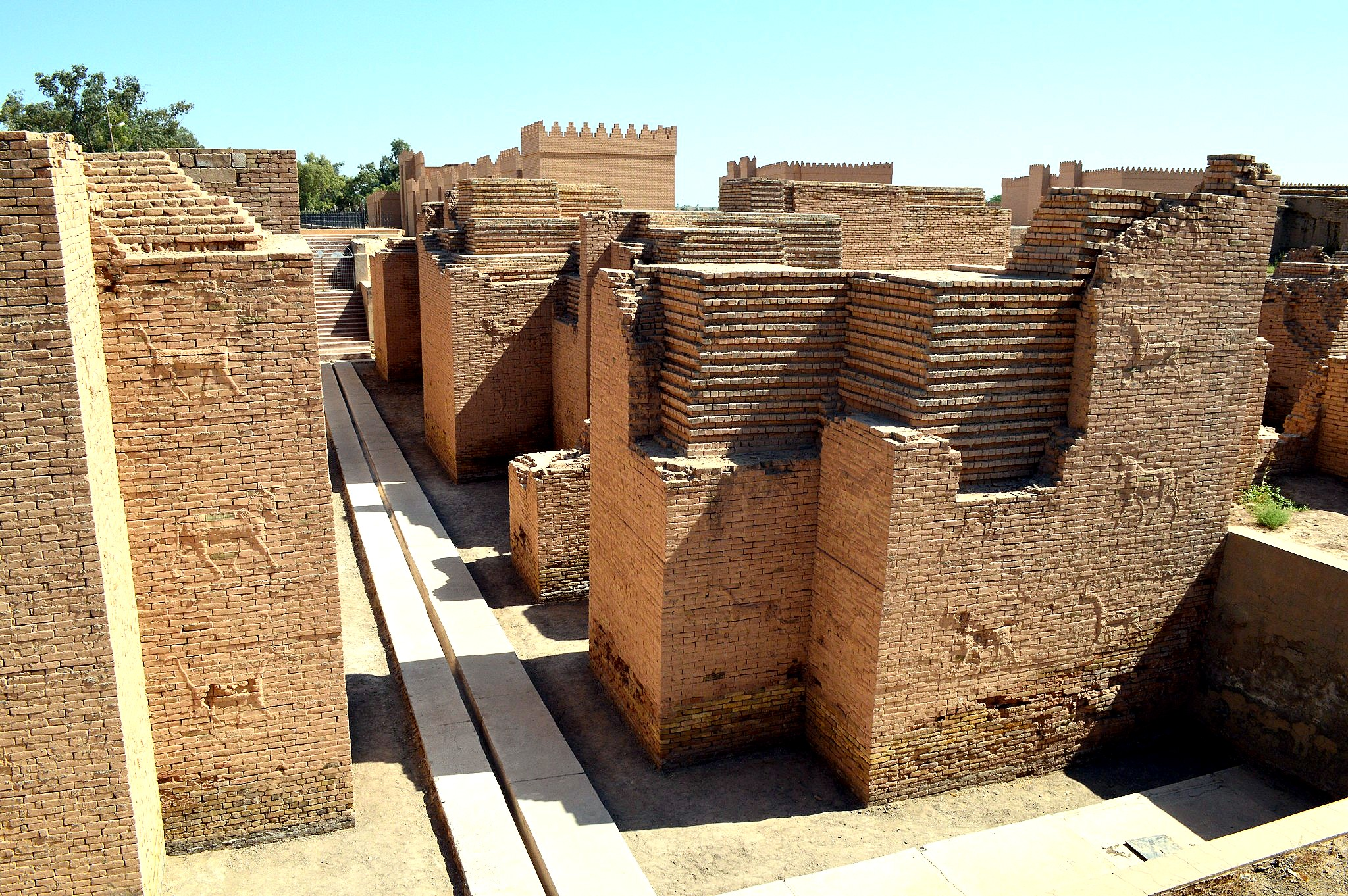
Processional Way partial reconstruction in Babylon

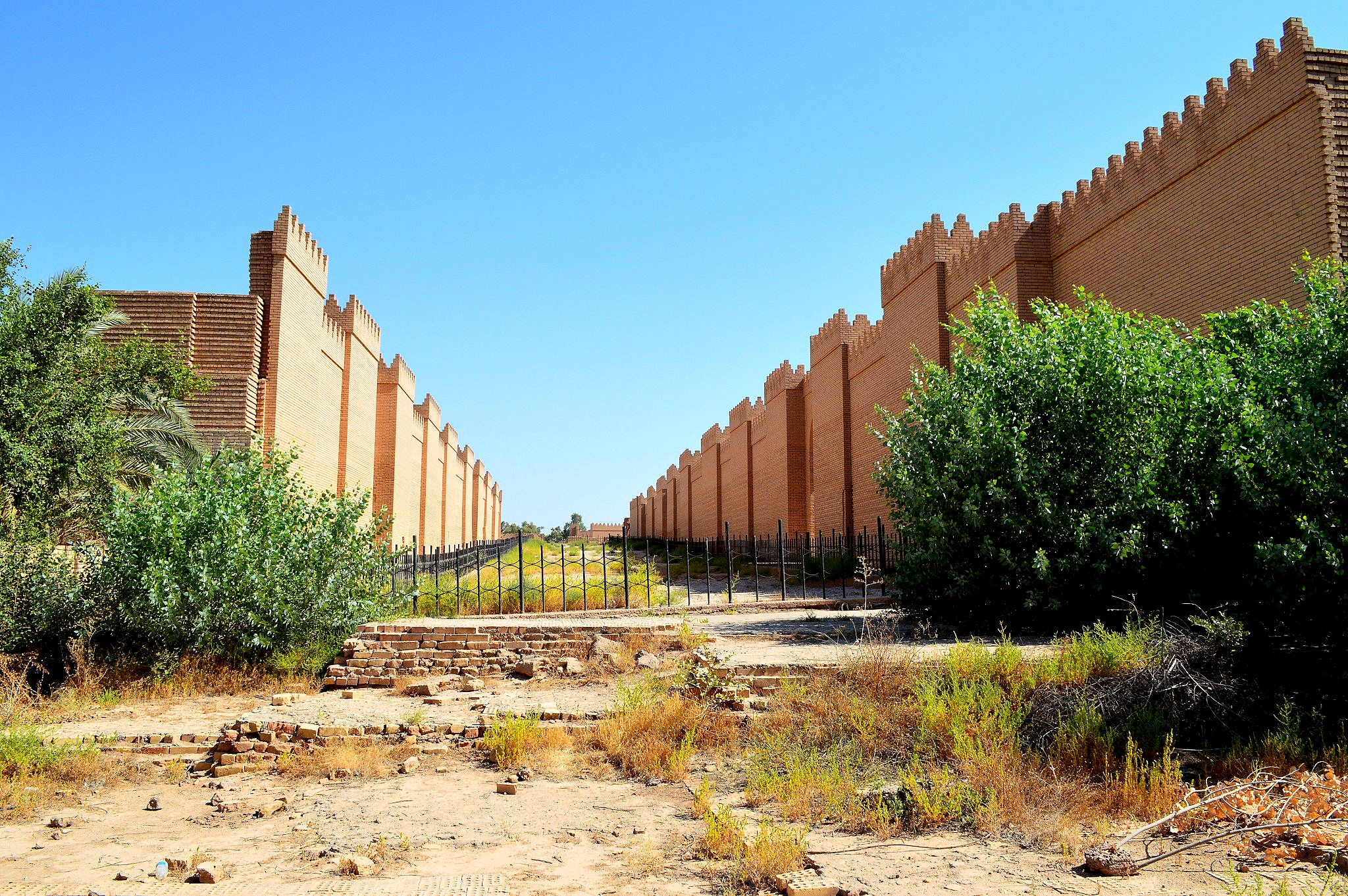
Processional Way partial reconstruction in Babylon

== See also ==
- Ishtar Gate

== Bibliography ==
- Baker, Heather D. (2022). "Reconstructing Ancient Babylon: Myth and Reality". Canadian Society for Mesopotamian Studies Journal. 14: 15–28.
- George, A. R. (1992). Babylonian Topographical Texts. Orientalia Lovaniensia analecta 40. Leuven, Belgium: Departement Oriëntalistiek; Peeters Press. ISBN 90-6831-410-6. OCLC 27918563.
- Heinsch, Sandra; Kuntner, Walter (2011). "Herodot und die Stadtmauern Babylons". In R. Rollinger (ed.). Herodot und das Persische Weltreich. Classica et Orientalia 3. Wiesbaden, Germany: Harrassowitz Verlag. pp. 499–529.
- Pedersén, Olof (2021). Babylon: The Great City. Münster, Germany: Zaphon. ISBN 978-3-96327-136-6.
