= Seven Wonders of the Ancient World =

Remarkable constructions of classical antiquity

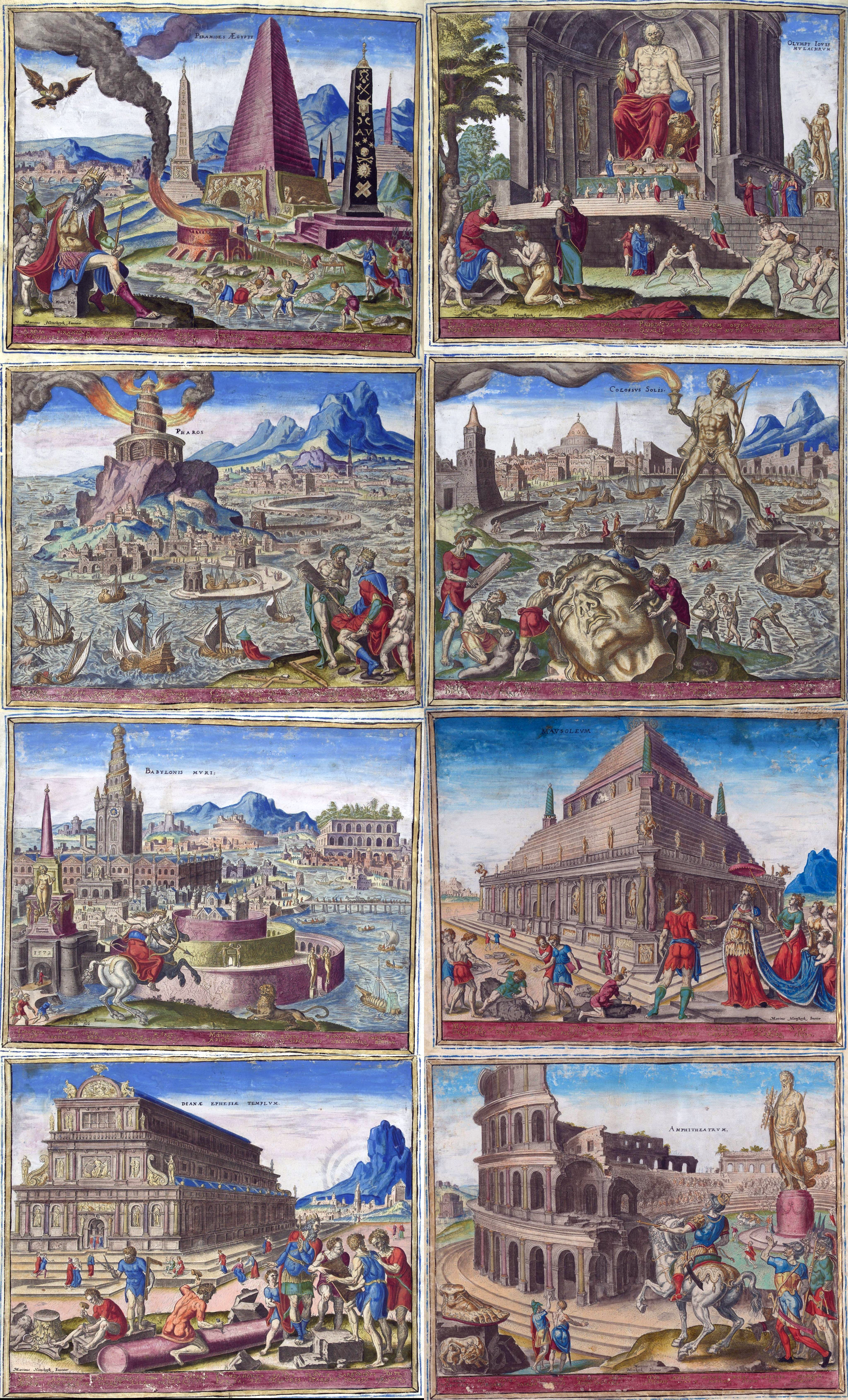
The Octo Mundi Miracula's imagined depictions of the Seven Wonders of the Ancient World, which established the modern canonical list of seven. From left to right, top to bottom: Great Pyramid of Giza, Statue of Zeus at Olympia, Lighthouse of Alexandria, Colossus of Rhodes, Hanging Gardens of Babylon, Mausoleum at Halicarnassus, and the Temple of Artemis. The author added the Colosseum as an eighth wonder.

The Seven Wonders of the Ancient World, also known as the Seven Wonders of the World or simply the Seven Wonders, is a list of seven notable structures present during classical antiquity, first established in the 1572 publication Octo Mundi Miracula using a combination of historical sources.

The seven traditional wonders established by the Octo Mundi Miracula are the Great Pyramid of Giza, the Colossus of Rhodes, the Lighthouse of Alexandria, the Mausoleum at Halicarnassus, the Temple of Artemis at Ephesus, the Statue of Zeus at Olympia, and the Hanging Gardens of Babylon. Using modern-day countries, two of the wonders were located in Greece, two in Turkey, two in Egypt, and one in Iraq. Of the seven wonders, only the Pyramid of Giza, by far the oldest, remains, while the others have been destroyed over the centuries. Remains exist from the Lighthouse, Temple of Artemis and the Mausoleum – either in situ or in museums. There is scholarly debate over the exact nature of the Hanging Gardens, and there is doubt as to whether they existed at all.

All known ancient and classical lists of wonders differ from the Octo Mundi Miracula version. The first known list of seven wonders dates back to the 2nd–1st century BC; at least eight full lists and ten partial lists are known. Three other wonders appear more than twice across these lists: the Walls of Babylon, the Palace of Cyrus the Great, and the Pergamon Altar.

== Background ==
Alexander the Great's conquest of much of the western world in the 4th century BC gave Hellenistic travellers access to the civilizations of the Egyptians, Persians, and Babylonians. Impressed and captivated by the landmarks and marvels of the various lands, these travellers began to list what they saw to remember them.

Instead of "wonders", the ancient Greeks spoke of "theamata" (θεάματα), which means "sights", in other words "things to be seen" (Τὰ ἑπτὰ θεάματα τῆς οἰκουμένης [γῆς] Tà heptà theámata tēs oikoumenēs [gēs]). Later, the word for "wonder" ("thaumata" θαύματα, "wonders") was used. Hence, the list was meant to be the ancient world's counterpart of a travel guidebook.

== Known lists ==
The first reference to a list of seven such monuments was given by Diodorus Siculus; he did not provide the list itself, mentioning only the Walls of Babylon and the Pyramids. The epigrammist Antipater of Sidon, who lived around or before 100 BC, gave a list of seven "wonders", including six of the present list (substituting the walls of Babylon for the Lighthouse of Alexandria):

I have gazed on the walls of impregnable Babylon along which chariots may race, and on the Zeus by the banks of the Alpheus, I have seen the hanging gardens, and the Colossus of the Helios, the great man-made mountains of the lofty pyramids, and the gigantic tomb of Mausolus; but when I saw the sacred house of Artemis that towers to the clouds, the others were placed in the shade, for the sun himself has never looked upon its equal outside Olympus.

— Greek Anthology IX.58

Another ancient writer who, perhaps dubiously, identified himself as Philo of Byzantium, wrote a short account entitled The Seven Sights of the World. The surviving manuscript is incomplete, missing its last pages. Still, from the preamble text, it is possible that the list of seven sights exactly matches Antipater's (the preamble mentions the location of Halicarnassus, but the pages describing the seventh wonder, presumably the Mausoleum, are missing). Earlier and later lists by the historian Herodotus (c. 484 BC – c. 425 BC) and the poet Callimachus of Cyrene (c. 305 BC – c. 240 BC), housed at the Museum of Alexandria, survive only as references.

The listing of seven of the most marvellous architectural and artistic human achievements continued beyond the Ancient Greek times to the Roman Empire, the Middle Ages, the Renaissance and to the modern age. The Roman poet Martial and the Christian bishop Gregory of Tours had their versions. Reflecting the rise of Christianity and the factor of time, nature and the hand of man overcoming Antipater's seven wonders, Roman and Christian sites began to figure on the list, including the Colosseum, Noah's Ark, and Solomon's Temple. In the 6th century, a list of seven wonders was compiled by St. Gregory of Tours: the list included the Temple of Solomon, the Pharos of Alexandria, and Noah's Ark.

German classical scholar Wilhelm Heinrich Roscher's list of 18 known classical lists of wonders, both complete and incomplete, published in 1906, showed only two of the 18 lists being identical – and considered the second was simply a later copy of the first. Roscher's list of lists is shown below; none of the lists match the modern "canonical" seven (shown in bold). The 18 lists contain 82 names, with a total of 22 distinct buildings or places:

	Complete								Incomplete										Number
	Antipater	Hyginus	Madrid(a)	Heraclitus(a)	Gregory	Anthol.VIII	Anthol.IX	Ampelius	Diodorus	Strabo	Eustathius	Valerius	Plutarch	Pausanias	Lucian	Heraclitus(b)	Philo	Madrid(b)	Number
I. Babylon walls																			10
**II. Pyramids**																			**10**
**III. Mausoleum**																			**9**
**IV. Colossus**																			**11**
**V. Artemis tem.**																			**8**
**VI. Zeus sta.**																			**6**
VII. Cyrus' palace																			4
VIII. Thebes (Eg)																			2
IX. Cyzicus temple																			2
X. Heraclea theatre																			1
XI. Delos																			2
XII. Thebes (Gr)																			2
**XIII. Hanging Gdns.**																			**5**
XIV. Capitoline																			2
XV. Pergamon altar																			3
**XVI. Lighthouse**																			**3**
XVII. Chalke gate																			1
XVIII. Zeus tem.																			1
XIX. Myra thea.																			1
XX. Asclepius San.																			1
XXI. Parion altar																			1
XXII. Athena statue																			1
Number	7	7	7	7	7	7	7	7	2	3	4	1	1	2	2	5	5	5	

Modern historians, working on the premise that the original Seven Ancient Wonders List was limited in its geographic scope, also had their versions to encompass sites beyond the Hellenistic realm—from the Seven Wonders of the Ancient World to the Seven Wonders of the World. The "seven wonders" label has spawned innumerable versions among international organizations, publications and individuals based on different themes—works of nature, engineering masterpieces, constructions of the Middle Ages, etc. Its purpose has also changed from just a simple travel guidebook or a compendium of curious places to a list of sites to defend or preserve.

== Canonical seven wonders ==
Timeline, and map of the Octo Mundi Miracula's Seven Wonders. Dates in bold green and dark red are of their construction and destruction, respectively.

The modern canonical list was first established in the 1572 publication Octo Mundi Miracula using a combination of historical sources.

The list covered only the Mediterranean and Middle Eastern regions, which then comprised the known world for the Greeks. The primary accounts from Hellenistic writers also heavily influenced the places included in the wonders list. Five of the seven entries are a celebration of Greek accomplishments in construction, the exceptions being the Pyramids of Giza and the Hanging Gardens of Babylon.

The Colossus of Rhodes was the last of the seven to be completed, after 280 BC, and the first to be destroyed, by an earthquake in 226/225 BC. It was therefore already in ruins by the time the list was compiled, and all seven wonders existed simultaneously for less than 60 years.

Of the canonical wonders, the only one that has survived to the present day is the Great Pyramid of Giza. Its brilliant white stone facing had survived intact until around 1300 AD, when local communities removed most of the stonework for building materials. The existence of the Hanging Gardens has not been proven, though theories abound. Records and archaeology confirm the existence of the other five wonders. The Temple of Artemis and the Statue of Zeus were destroyed by fire, while the Lighthouse of Alexandria, the Colossus, and tomb of Mausolus were destroyed by earthquakes. Among the surviving artifacts are sculptures from the tomb of Mausolus and the Temple of Artemis, currently kept in the British Museum in London.

The revival of Greco-Roman artistic styles caught the imagination of European artists and travellers. Paintings and sculptures alluding to the canonical list were made, while significant numbers of adventurers travelled to the actual sites to personally witness the wonders. Legends circulated to further complement the superlatives of the wonders.

Canonical Seven Wonders of the Ancient World
Name	Date of construction	Builders	Date of destruction	Cause of destruction	Modern location	Modern status	Image
Great Pyramid of Giza	2584–2561 BC	Egyptians	Still in existence, majority of façade gone		Giza Necropolis, Egypt; 29°58′45.03″N 31°08′03.69″E	Standing	
Hanging Gardens of Babylon (existence unresolved)	c. 600 BC (evident)	Babylonians or Assyrians	After 1st century AD	Unknown	Hillah or Nineveh, Iraq; 32.5355°N 44.4275°E	No trace	
Statue of Zeus at Olympia	466–456 BC (temple); 435 BC (statue)	Greeks (Phidias)	5th–6th centuries AD	Disassembled and reassembled at Constantinople; later destroyed by fire	Olympia, Greece; 37°38′16.3″N 21°37′48″E	No trace of statue; remains of the Temple of Zeus	
Temple of Artemis at Ephesus	c. 550 BC; and again in 323 BC	Greeks, Lydians	356 BC (by Herostratus); AD 262 (by the Goths)	Arson by Herostratus, plundering	Near Selçuk, Turkey; 37°56′59″N 27°21′50″E	Remains of the temple	
Mausoleum at Halicarnassus	351 BC	Greeks, Persians, Carians (Satyros and Pythius of Priene)	12th–15th century AD	Earthquakes	Bodrum, Turkey; 37.0379°N 27.4241°E	Remains of the Mausoleum, including at the British Museum	
Colossus of Rhodes	292–280 BC	Greeks (Chares of Lindos)	226 BC	Destroyed by earthquake	Rhodes, Greece; 36°27′04″N 28°13′40″E	No trace	
Lighthouse of Alexandria	c. 280 BC	Greeks, Ptolemaic Egyptians	AD 1303–1480	Destroyed by earthquake	Alexandria, Egypt; 31°12′50″N 29°53′08″E	Remains found underwater in 1994	

== See also ==
- New 7 Wonders of the World, a campaign for people to vote and choose Wonders of the World from a selection of 200 existing monuments.
- Eighth Wonder of the World, about attempted additions to the famous ancient list.
- Wonders of the World, about similar lists made throughout the ages.
- Seven Wonders of the World (1956 film)
- 7 Wonders of the Ancient World (2007 video game)
- 7 Wonders (2010 board game)
- Seven Wonders (2013 book series)
