= Octo Mundi Miracula =

Series of engravings by Philips Galle

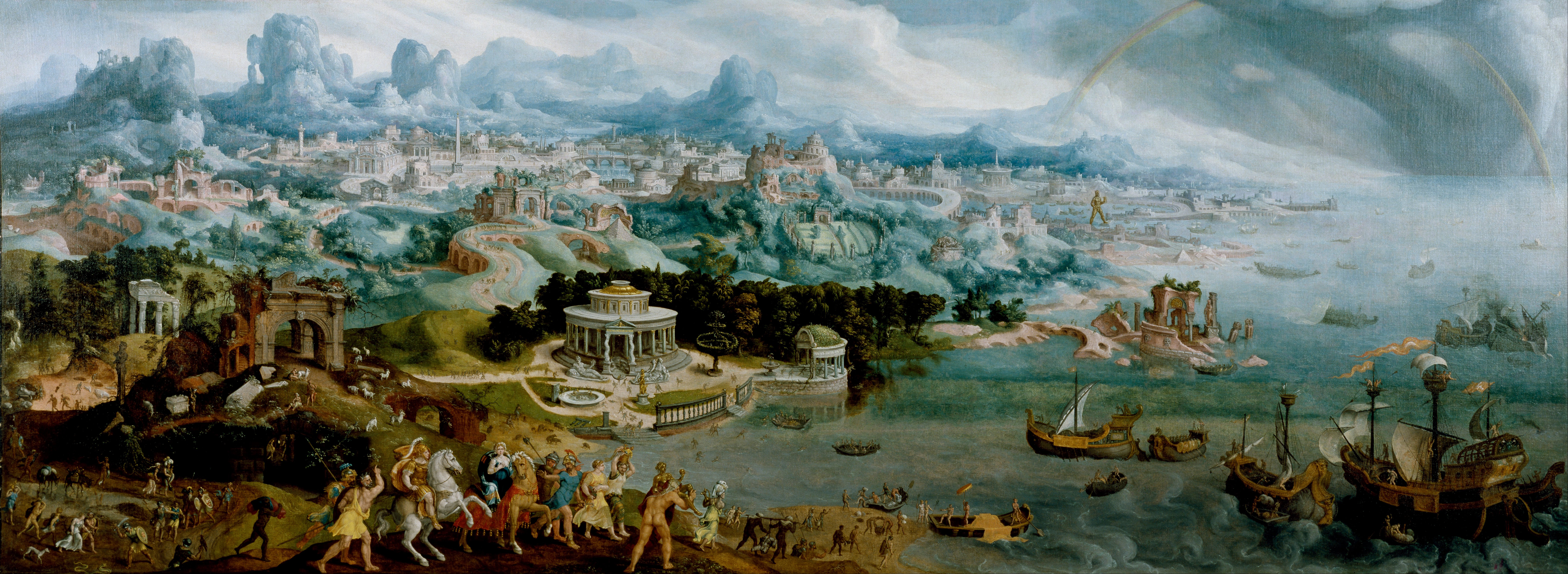
This 1535 painting, Panorama with the Abduction of Helen Amidst the Wonders of the Ancient World, was painted by Maerten van Heemskerck 37 years prior to the Octo Mundi Miracula. It is considered van Heemskerck's prototype for his images of the Colossus, the Lighthouse, the Temple of Artemis and the Hanging Gardens.

Octo Mundi Miracula (Note: transl. Eight Wonders of the World; Dutch: De acht wereldwonderen; French: Huit Merveilles du monde antique, lit. 'Eight wonders of the ancient world') is a series of engravings published in 1572 by the Flemish engraver Philips Galle, based on a set of eight drawings by Dutch painter Maarten van Heemskerck, with accompanying elegiac couplet verses written by Hadrianus Junius. Heemskerck's primary source was Pedro Mexía's 1540 Silva de varia lección, which noted how the classical sources for the Seven Wonders of the Ancient World do not agree on a consistent list.

The series is considered the first known complete visual representation of the Seven Wonders of the Ancient World, and created the modern canonical list of seven wonders – the specific list had not existed in the various classical sources. Despite creating the modern canonical seven, the engravings included an eighth monument—the Colosseum—following van Heemskerck's 1533 Self-Portrait with the Colosseum.

Architectural historian Professor Andrew Hopkins of the University of L'Aquila wrote that the Octo Mundi Miracula's "images of these monuments were so visually compelling they became the roster, akin to the standardizing order of the orders achieved by Sebastiano Serlio in 1537, with his treatise Regole generali di architetura".

== History ==
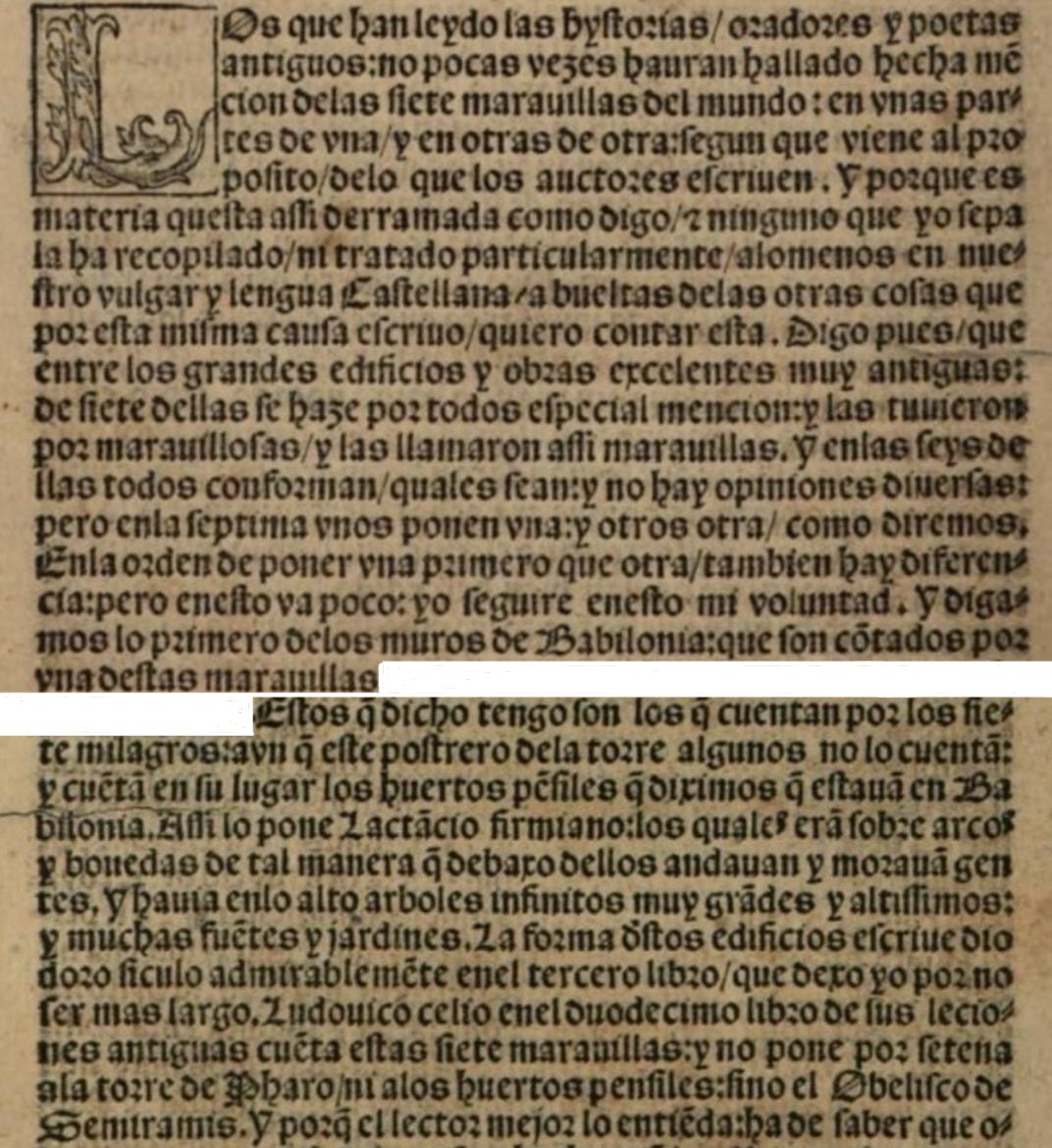
Pedro Mexía - Seven Wonders in 1547, extracts from pages ccxxv–ccxxx (Capitulo XXXII– XXXIII)

The series was published during the late Northern Renaissance, in the Habsburg Netherlands during the early states of the Dutch Revolt. Heemskerck had been influenced by his travels to Rome (1532–1536/37) where he had studied ruins and the monuments of classical antiquity. Philips Galle was an engraver and publisher, whereas Hadrianus Junius was a humanist poet.

Heemskerck's primary source was Pedro Mexía's 1540 Silva de varia lección, as the classical descriptions of the Seven Wonders of the Ancient World do not agree on a consistent list. Mexía wrote as follows:

Those who have read the histories, orators, and ancient poets will often have found mention of the Seven Wonders of the World: sometimes of one, sometimes of another, depending on the purpose of what the authors are writing. And because this material is so scattered, as I said, and no one that I know of has compiled or treated it in particular, at least in our common tongue… among the great and excellent ancient buildings, seven are mentioned especially by all, and they were considered marvelous, and thus were called wonders. And on six of them everyone agrees on which they are, and there are no differing opinions; but on the seventh, some list one, and others another, as we shall discuss. There is also variation in the order in which they are listed; but that matters little: I will proceed according to my own preference. Let us begin with the walls of Babylon, which are counted among these wonders… Those I have mentioned are the ones considered the seven miracles; although the last, the tower, some do not include it, and instead list the Hanging Gardens, which we say were in Babylon… Ludovico Celio, in the twelfth book of his ancient lectures, recounts these seven wonders; and instead of including the Lighthouse of Pharos or the Hanging Gardens, he includes the Obelisk of Semiramis.

== Work ==
=== Engravings ===
The eight engravings are as follows:

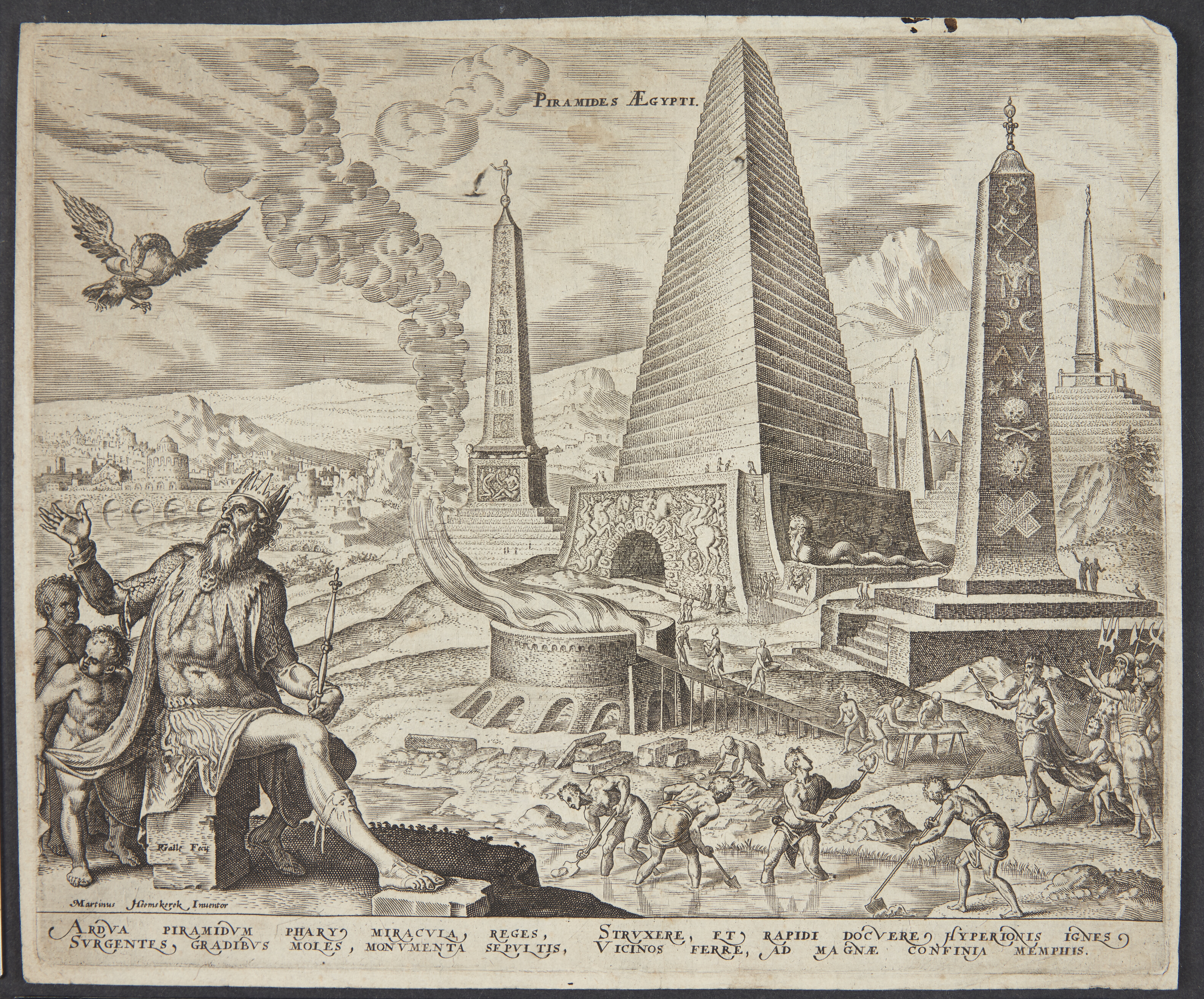
The Great Pyramid of Giza: "Piramides Aegypti"

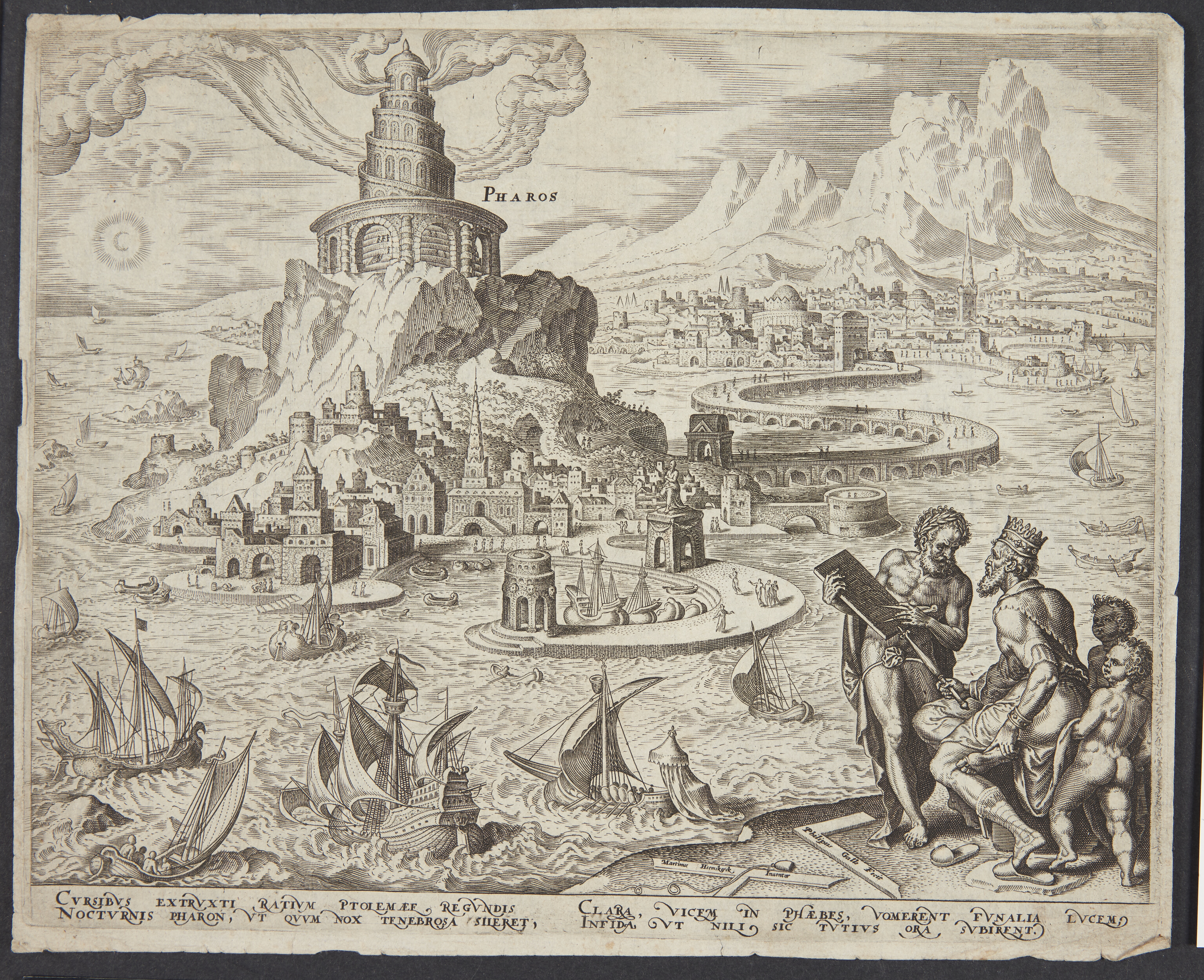
The Lighthouse of Alexandria: "Pharos"

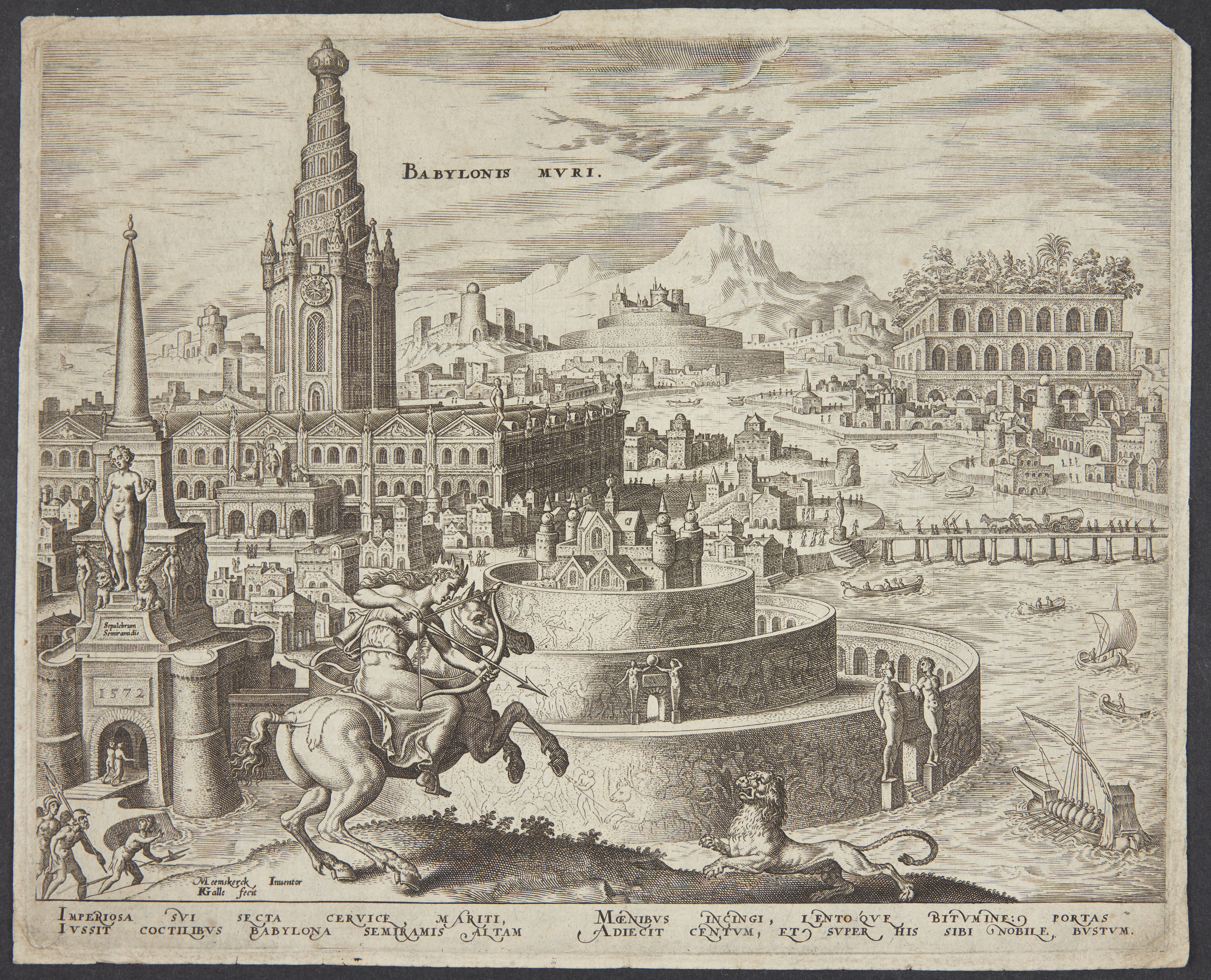
The Hanging Gardens and Walls of Babylon: "Babylonis Muri"

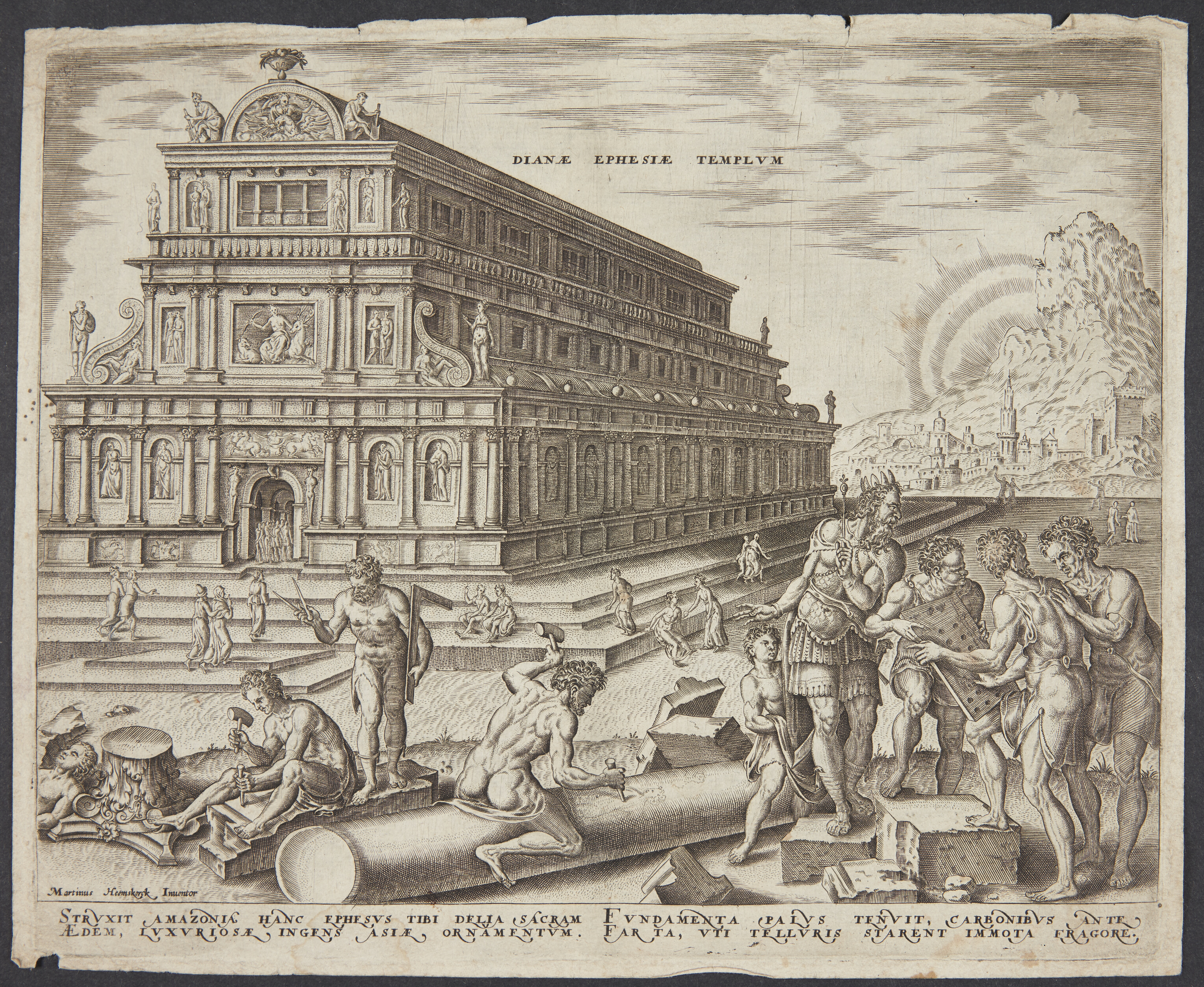
The Temple of Artemis at Ephesus: "Dianae Ephesiae Templum"

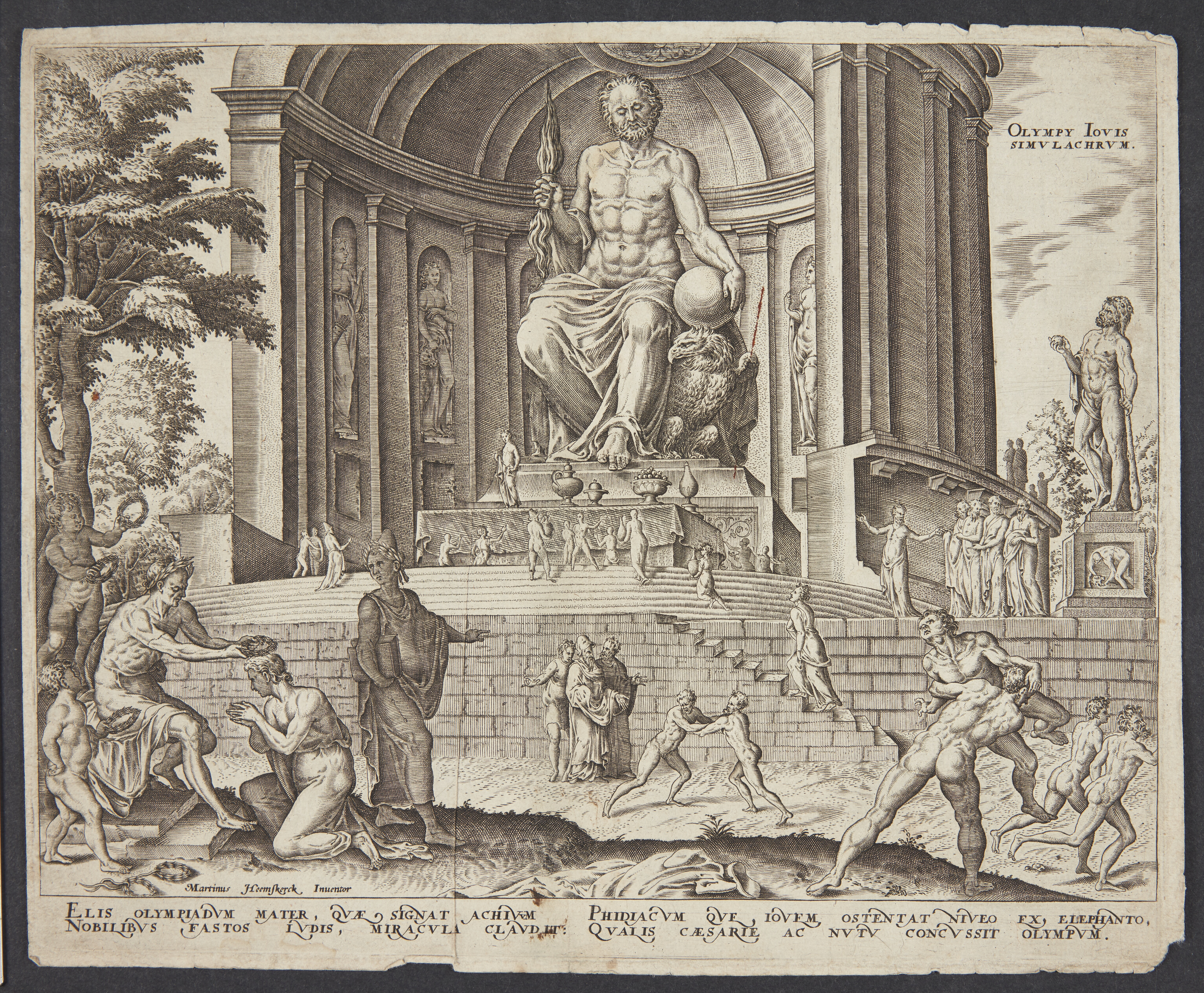
The Statue of Zeus at Olympia: "Olympy lovis simulacrum"

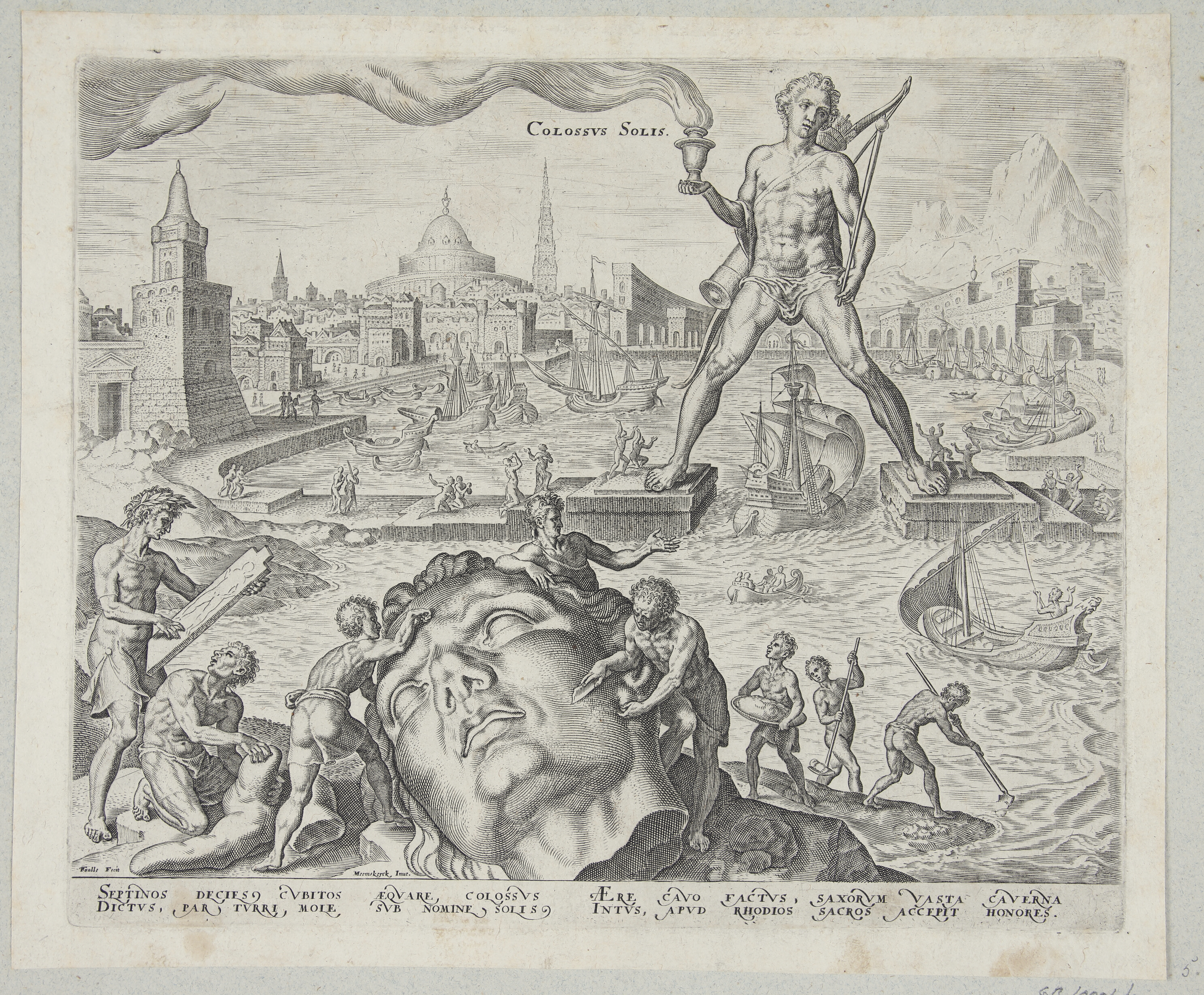
The Colossus of Rhodes: "Colossus Solis"

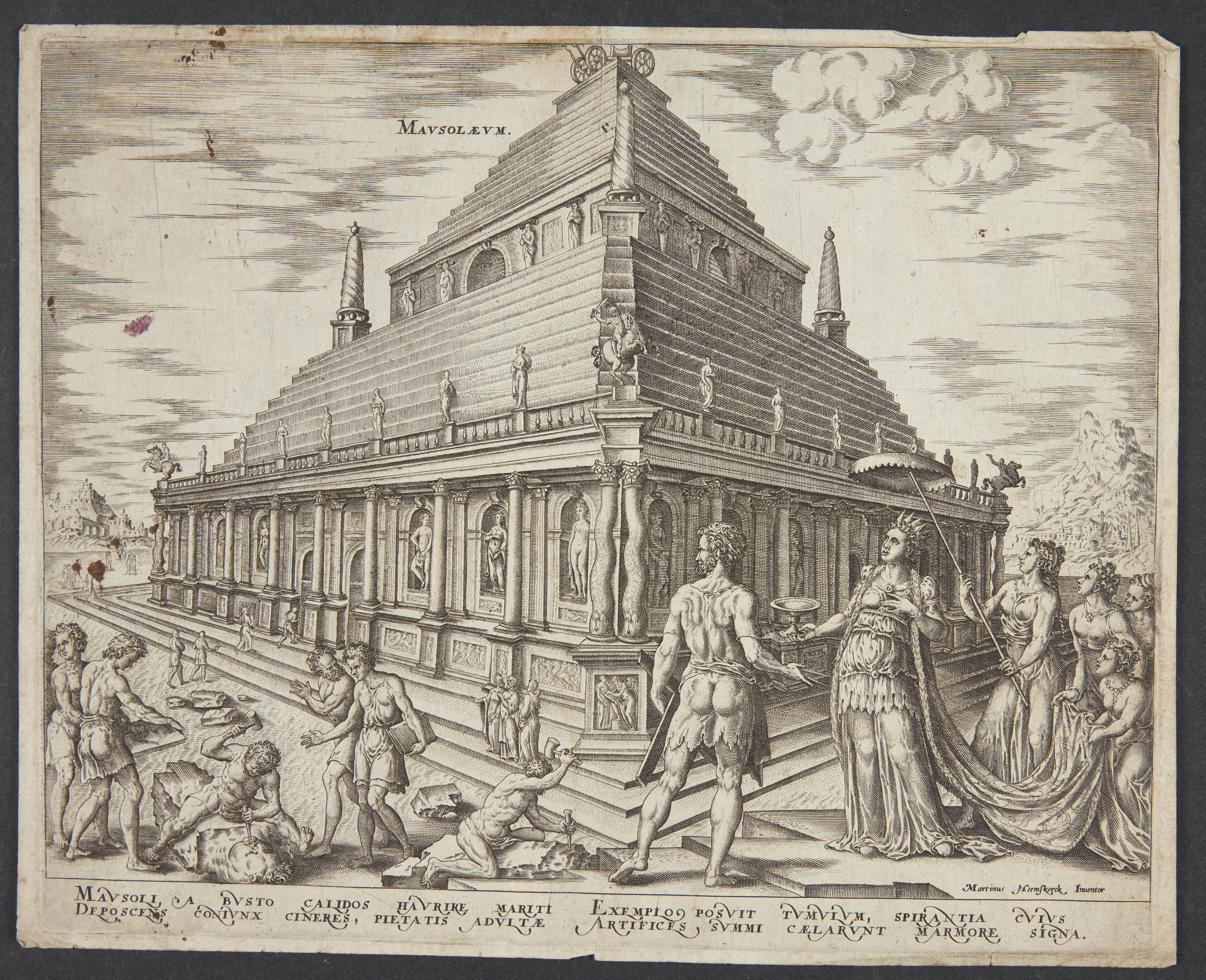
The Mausoleum at Halicarnassus: "Mausoleum"

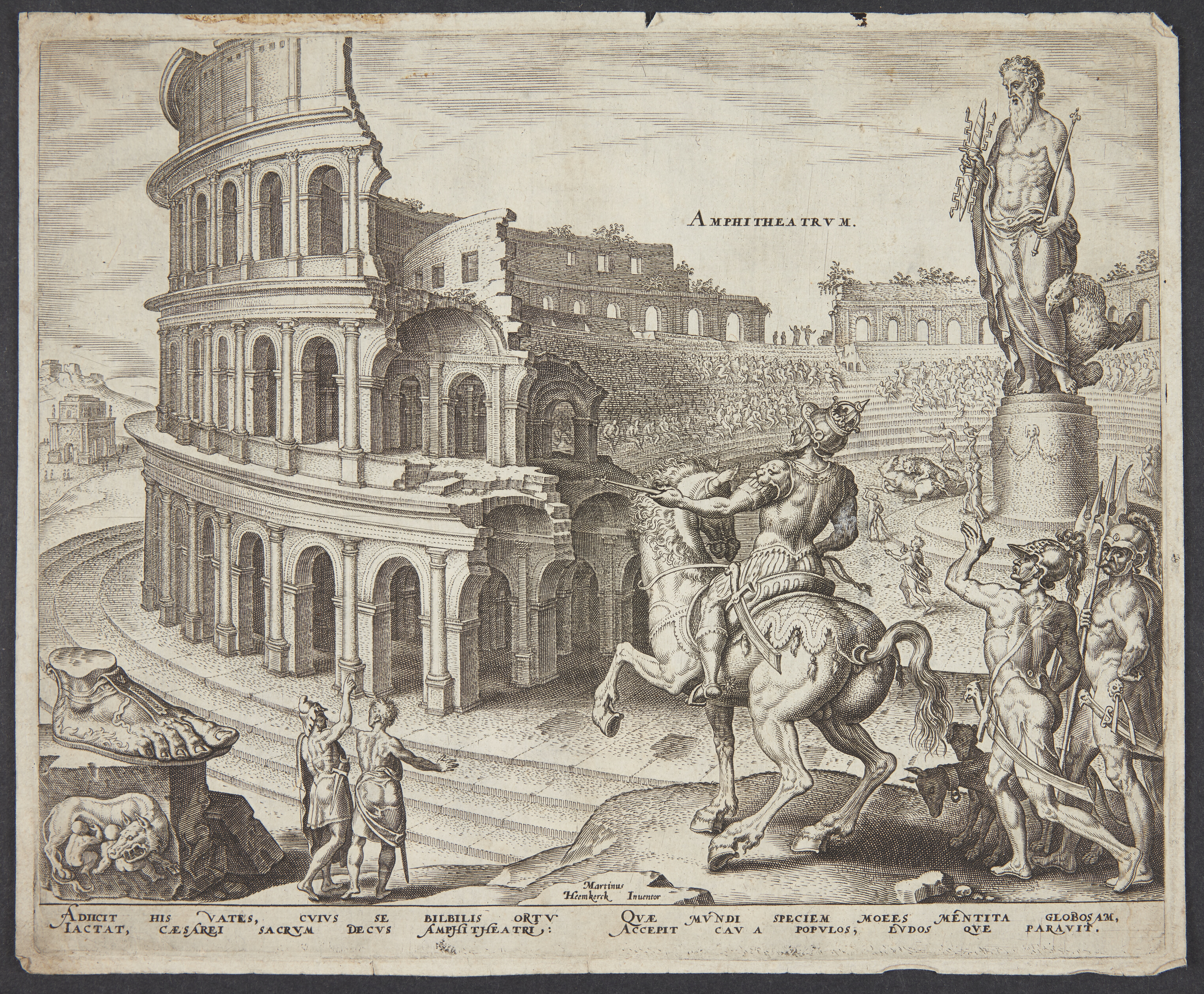
The Colosseum of Rome: "Amphitheatrum" (Heemskerck's addition)

Heemskerck's inclusion of the Colosseum deviates from the traditional "seven" and reflects a personal reverence, having studied the Colosseum firsthand in Rome and included it in his 1553 Self-Portrait with the Colosseum. It was the only one of the eight engravings pictured as an actual ruin, rather than in idealized form, and was the only one that could be easily visited by van Heemskerck’s audience at the time.

Each engraving follows a formula: the wonder occupies the center, surrounded by its historical or mythical context, with rulers, workers, and gods. Junius' Latin elegiac couplets often reference the builder, the architectural marvel, or its legendary origin.

=== Verses ===
Humanist Hadrianus Junius composed Latin poems for each engraving. While not direct descriptions, the verses offer thematic context and moral reflection. They refer to figures such as Semiramis and Artemisia II and contain technical anecdotes from Roman sources, such as the use of charcoal under the Temple of Artemis.

	Original Latin	Translation
Great Pyramid of Giza	Ardva piramidvm phary miracvla reges Svrgentes gradibvs moles, monvmenta sepvltis, Struxere, et rapidi docvere Hyperionis ignes Vicinos ferre, ad magnae confinia Memphis	Lofty wonders of pyramids, Pharaohs' kings Built stepped structures, as monuments for the buried, They raised them, and showed the sun's rays To fall nearby, at the boundary of great Memphis
Lighthouse of Alexandria	Cvrsibvs extrvxti rativm Ptolemaee Regundis; Nocturnis pharon, vt qvvm nox tenebrosa sileret, Clara, vicem in Phaebes, vomerent funalia lvcem, Infida vt nili sic tvtivs ora svbirent.	For voyages, you built, Ptolemy, careful guide, A lighthouse for the night, so when dark night lay still, Bright torches, in the moon's place, would shine light, So that the Nile's treacherous shores be approached more safely.
Walls of Babylon	Imperiosa svi secta cervice mariti, Ivsset coctilibvs Babylona Semiramis altam Moenibvs incingi, lento qve bitvmine portas Adiecit centvm, et super his sibi nobile bustum	Imperious, with her husband's head cut off, Semiramis ordered lofty Babylon enclosed With baked-brick walls, and gates with firm bitumen One hundred added, and above them her noble tomb
Temple of Artemis	Strvxit amazonia hanc ephesvs tibi delia sacram Aedem, lvxvriosae ingens asiae ornamentvm. Fvndamenta palvs tenvit, carbonibvs ante Far ta, vti tellvris starent immota fragore.	An Amazon built this in Ephesus for you, Artemis, a sacred Temple, a luxurious and great Asian ornament. A marsh held its deep foundations, laid upon charcoals beforehand, So earth might stand unmoved in a quake.
Statue of Zeus at Olympia	Elis olympiadvm mater, qvae signat achivvm Nobilibvs fastos lvdis, miracvla clavdit: Phidiacvm qve iovem ostentat niveo ex elephanto Qvalis caesarie ac nvtv concvssit olympvm.	Elis, mother of Olympia, who signals Achaea; With famous games and records, she houses wonders: Showing Phidias' Zeus, carved from white ivory, Whose hair and nod once shook Olympus.
Colossus of Rhodes	Septimos decies cvbitos aeqvare colossvs Dictvs, par turri mole svb nomine solis Aere cavo factvs, saxorum vasta caverna Intvs, apvd Rhodios sacros accepit honores.	The Colossus, said to be 700 cubits, Equal in mass to a tower, under the Sun's name, Was made of hollow bronze, with a cavern of stone inside Among the Rhodians it received sacred honors.
Mausoleum at Halicarnassus	Mavsoli a bvsto calidos havrire mariti Deposcens conivnx cineres, pietatis advitae Exemplo posvit tvmvlvm spirantia cvivs Artifices svmmi caelarunt marmore signa.	From Mausolus's grave, his wife drew warmth, Imploring lifelong devotion to his ashes. Setting an example she erected a tomb, on which Artists carved the greatest statues from marble.
Colosseum of Rome	Adiicit his vates, cvivs se bilbilis ortv Iactat, caesarei sacrvm decvs amphitheatri: Qvae mvndi speciem moles mentita globosam Accepit cav a popvlos, lvdos qve paravit.	To these is added by the poet whose birth Bilbilis boasts (i.e. Martial), The sacred glory of the imperial amphitheatre: A structure that mimicked the globe's round shape, Hollow, it held the crowds and staged their games.

== Influence and legacy ==
Octo Mundi Miracula was copied and adapted in many works by artists such as Louis de Caullery and Willem Janszoon Blaeu (e.g. the 1630 Nova Totius Terrarum Orbis Geographica ac Hydrographica Tabula).

The series was seminal in shaping the iconography of the ancient wonders, as no standard visual tradition had previously existed.

== Collections and conservation ==
Prints from the Octo Mundi Miracula series are preserved in various museums and libraries, including:

- British Museum, London
- Rijksmuseum, Amsterdam
- Louvre, Paris
- Herzog August Bibliothek, Wolfenbüttel

The images below show the series in the order as originally published. From a 1572 copy at the Rijksmuseum, Amsterdam:

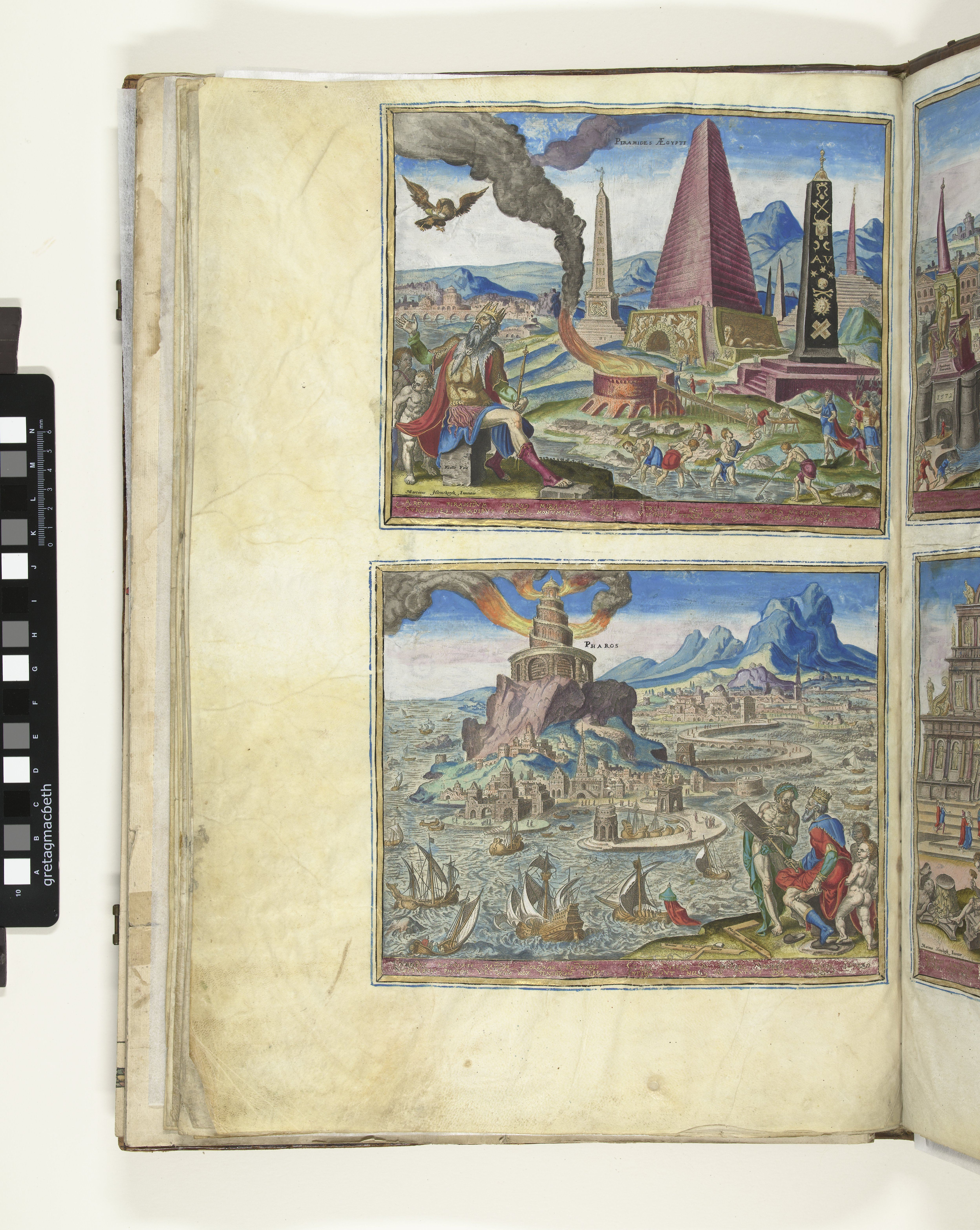
1. Pyramids
2. Lighthouse

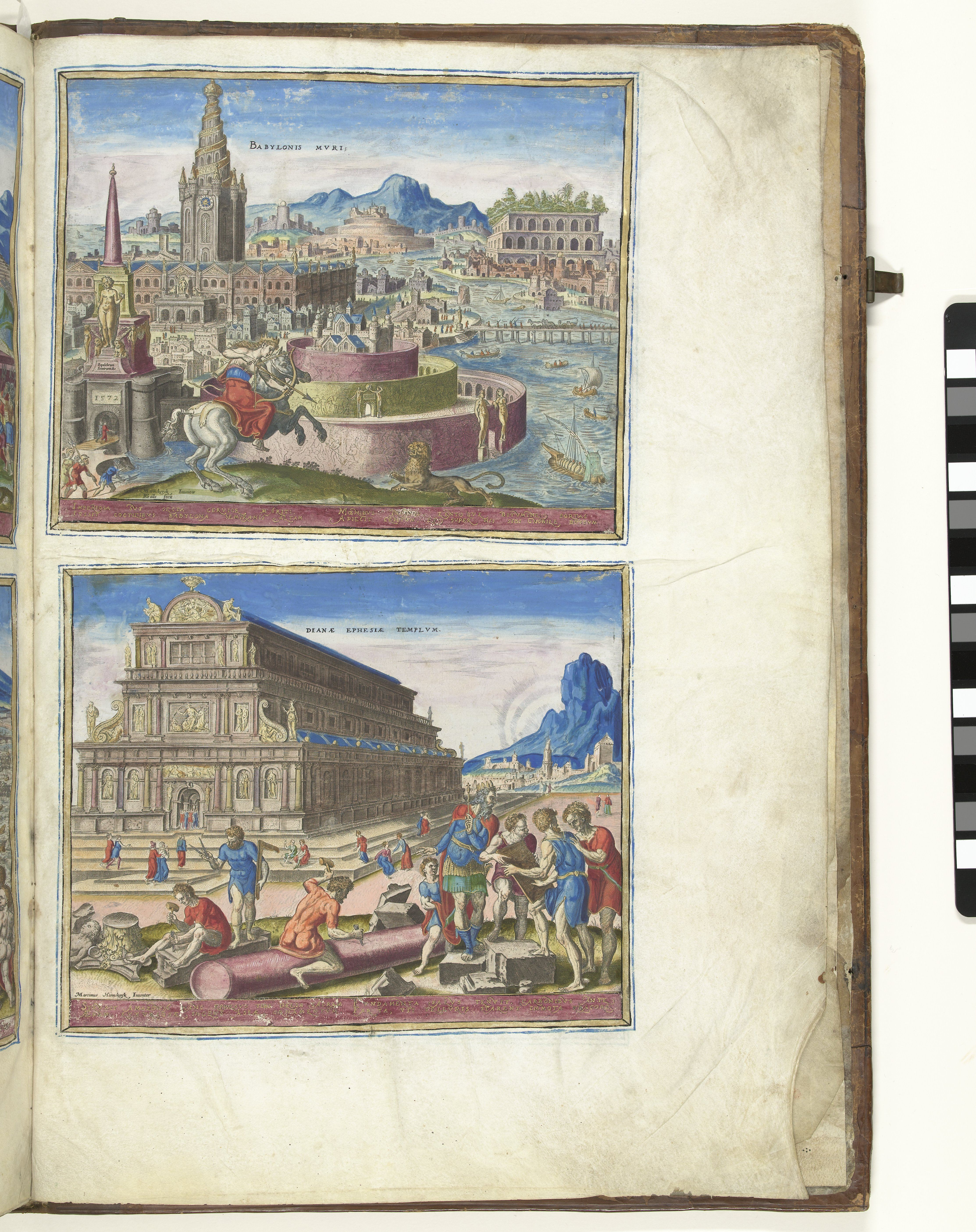
3. Babylon
4. Temple

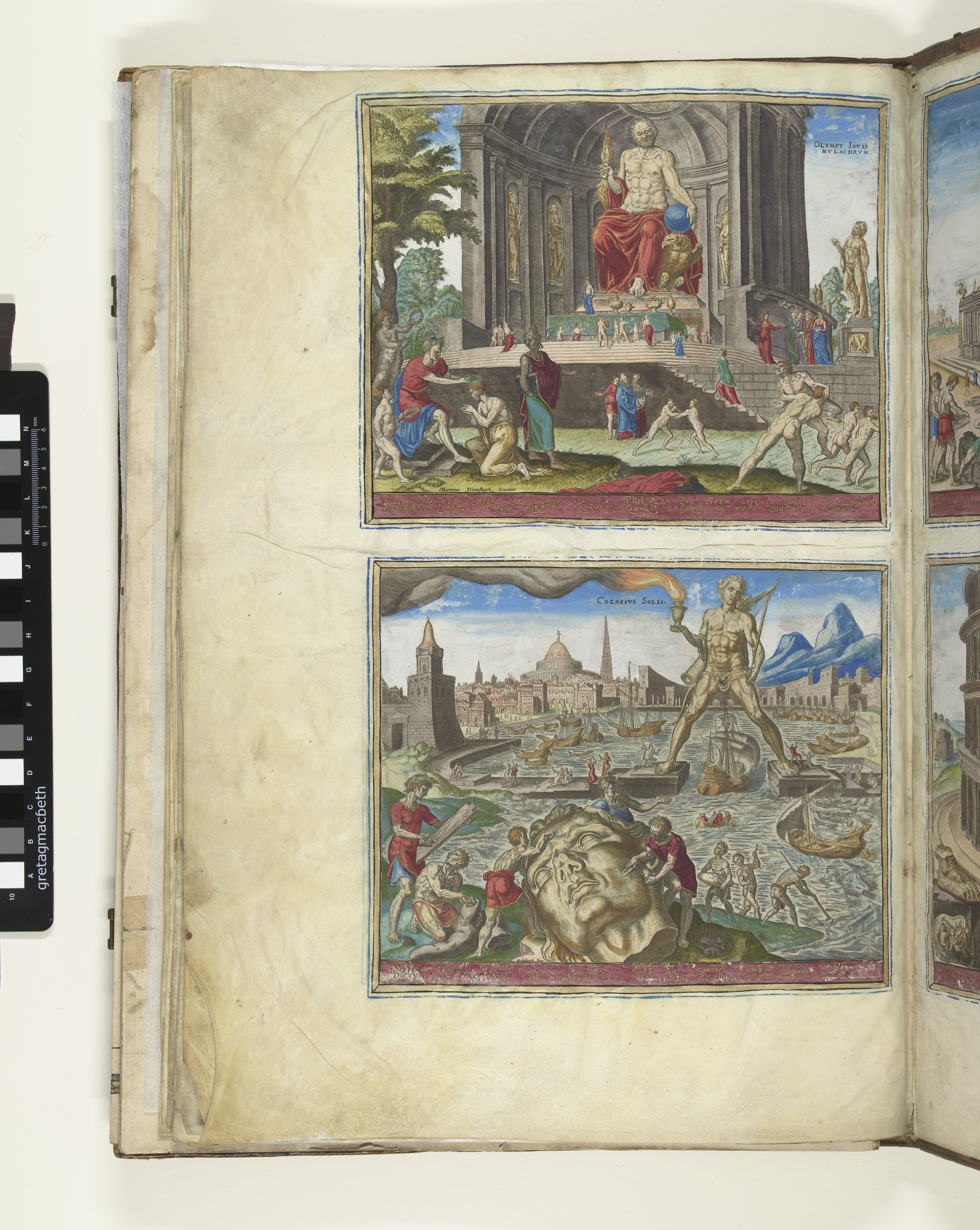
5. Zeus
6. Colossus

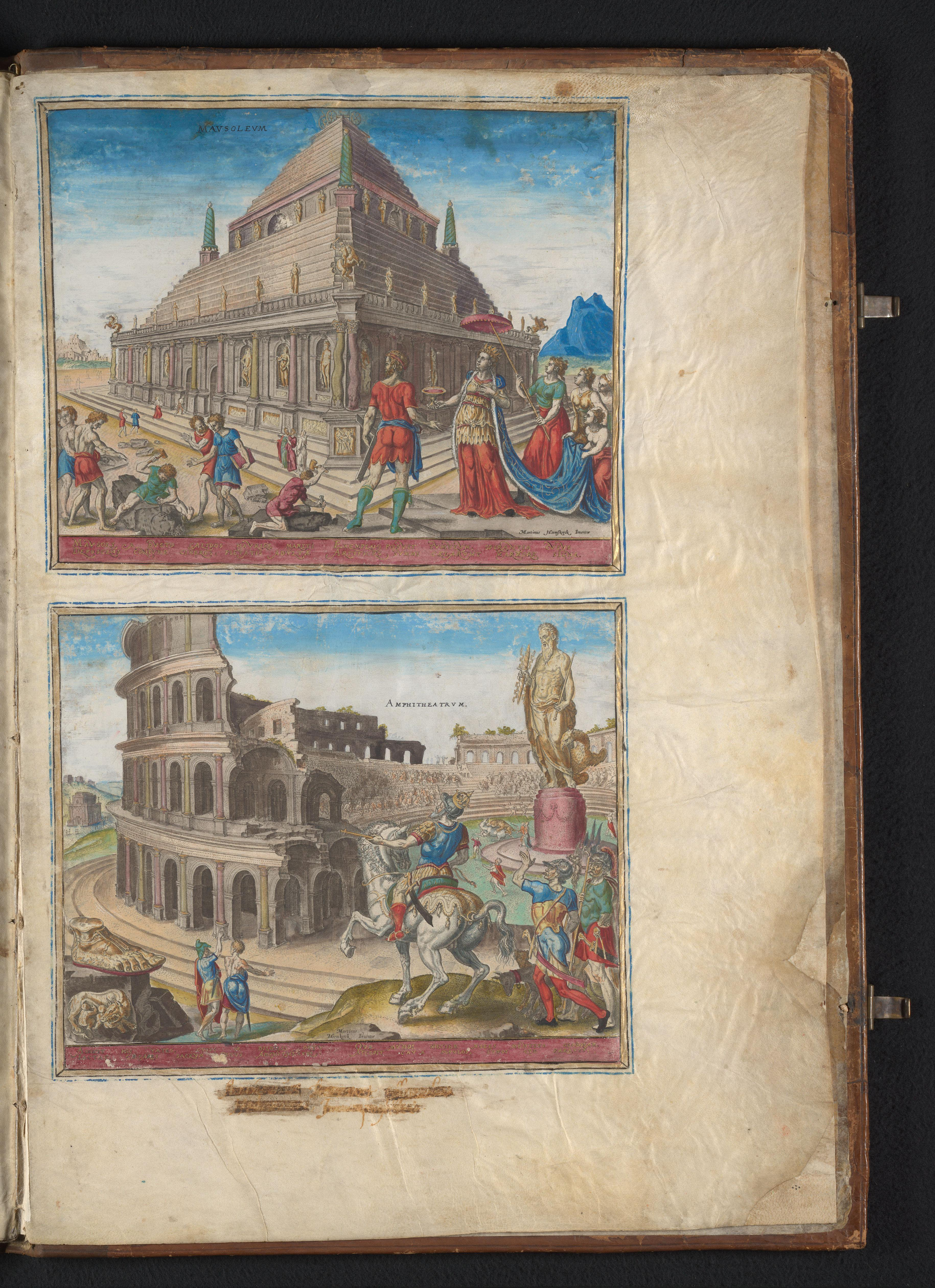
7. Mausoleum
8. Colosseum

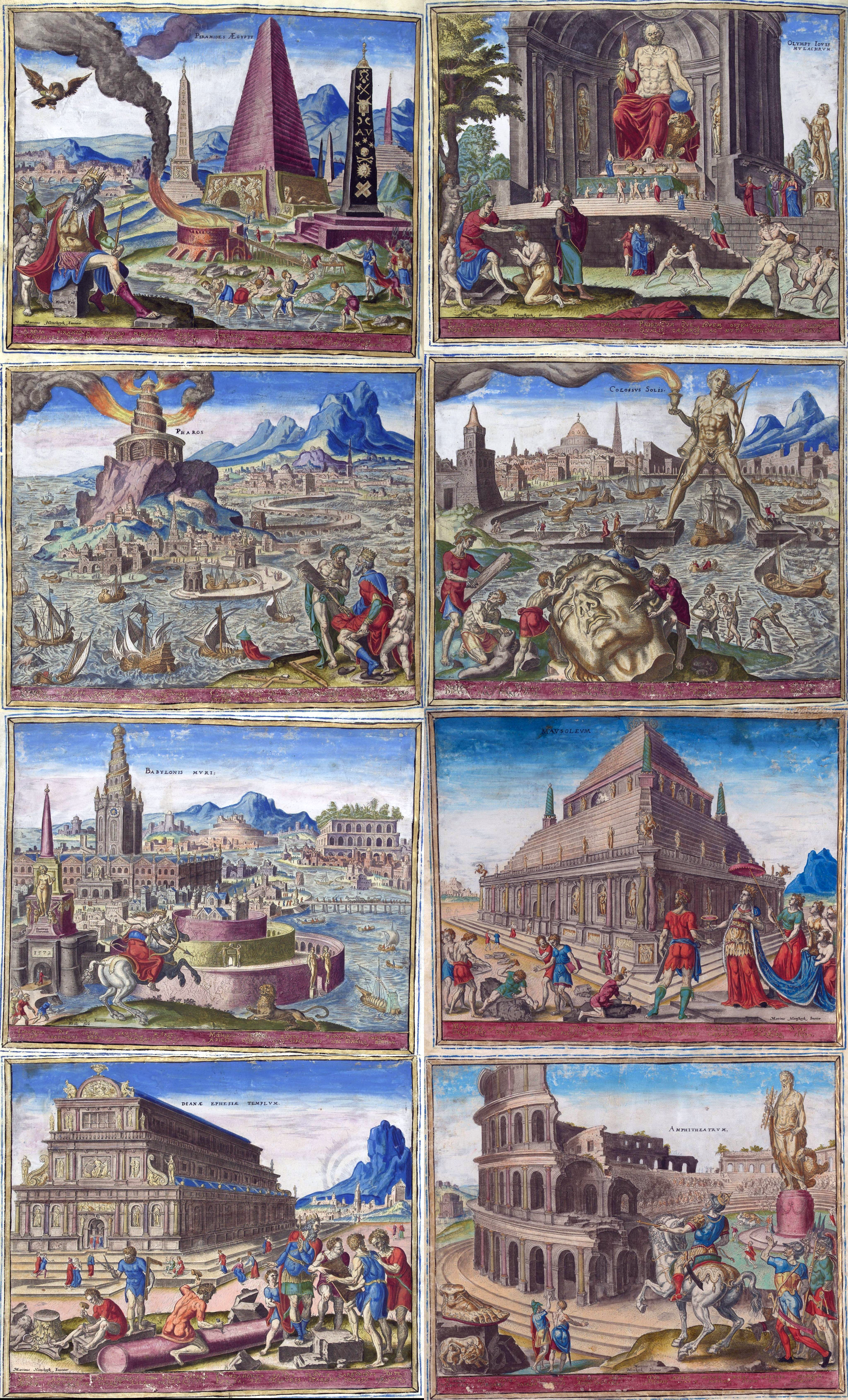
Combined

== Bibliography ==
- Clayton, Peter A.; Price, Martin J. (2013-08-21). Seven Wonders Ancient World. Routledge. ISBN 978-1-135-62928-1.
- Hopkins, Andrew (2024-11-04). "Chapter Five Conjuring up the Wonders: from text to image". Citation and Quotation in Early Modern Architecture. De Gruyter. pp. 137–170. doi:10.1515/9783111477909-006. ISBN 978-3-11-147790-9.
- Sammut, Adam (2022-01-02). "Maarten van Heemskerck's Eight Wonders of the Ancient World : Contesting the Image in an Age of Iconoclasm". Dutch Crossing. 46 (1): 27–49. doi:10.1080/03096564.2018.1524645. ISSN 0309-6564.
- Spronk, Ron (2016-11-07). "Maarten van Heemskerck's use of literary sources from antiquity for his Wonders of the World series of 1572". In Fenoulhet, Jane; Gilbert, Lesley (eds.). Narratives of Low Countries History and Culture. UCL Press. ISBN 978-1-910634-99-8.
- Tobin, Jennifer (2011-06-23). Seven Wonders of the Ancient World (PDF). Recorded Books, LLC. ISBN 978-1-4498-3527-9.
- Folin, Marco; Preti, Monica (2024-07-16). "Da Anversa a Roma e ritorno: Le Meraviglie del mondo di Maarten van Heemskerck e di Antonio Tempesta". Mitteilungen des Kunsthistorischen Institutes in Florenz (in Italian). 64 (1): 31–67 Seiten. doi:10.11588/MKHI.2022.1.105843.
- De Miguel Irureta, Ainhoa (2021). Las Siete Maravillas de la Antigüedad. Humanismo, transmisión cultural e influencias artísticas. RIUCAM Home (PhD thesis). Universidad Católica San Antonio de Murcia.
  - De Miguel Irureta, Ainhoa (2024-10-25). "Las siete maravillas de la Antigüedad en los soportes de la cultura popular". H-ART. Revista de historia, teoría y crítica de arte (18): 57–77. doi:10.25025/hart18.2024.03. ISSN 2590-9126.
