= Museum of Fine Arts, Ghent =

Museum of Fine Arts
- Museum voor Schone Kunsten
- Logotype

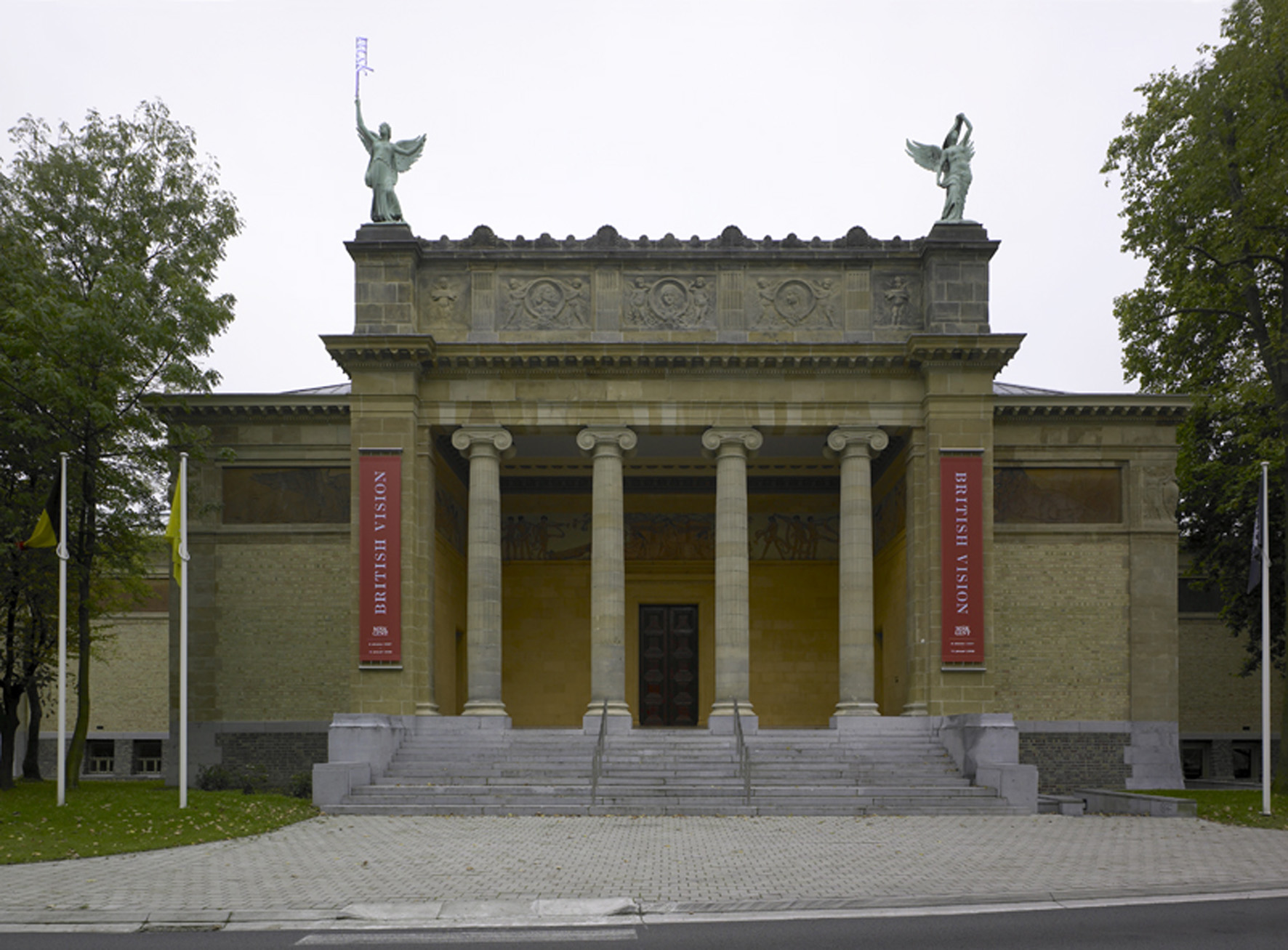
- Front view of the museum
- Established: 1798
- Location: Fernand Scribedreef 1, 9000 Ghent, Belgium
- Coordinates: 51.0383°N 3.7238°E
- Type: Art museum
- Website: www.mskgent.be/en/

The Museum of Fine Arts (Dutch: Museum voor Schone Kunsten, MSK) an art museum in Ghent, Belgium, is situated at the East side of the Citadelpark (near the Stedelijk Museum voor Actuele Kunst).

The museum's collection consists of some 9000 artworks, dating from the Middle Ages to the 20th century. Over 600 works can be found on display permanently, with the collection largely focusing on Flemish Art (Southern Netherlands). It also houses several European—especially French—paintings, in addition to a large amount of sculptures.

Next to its permanent collection the museum organises temporary exhibitions. Between March 2011 and January 2021, the museum conducted 41 exhibitions.

The building was designed by city architect Charles van Rysselberghe around 1900.

In 2007 the museum reopened after four years of restoration.

The museum is a member of The Flemish Art Collection. This is a structural partnership joining the three main museums of fine arts in Flanders: Royal Museum of Fine Arts, the Groeninge Museum in Bruges and the Ghent Museum of Fine Arts. The museums’ collections have all been developed in a similar way to complement each other. Together, they offer a representative overview of Flemish art from the 15th to the 20th century. The museum exchanges its expertise with other members in efforts of increased international awareness of their collections, including works that are part of the world patrimony.

In 2025, the museum and the city of Ghent rejected a claim for restitution from the heirs of Samuel Hartveld for a painting by Gaspar de Craye, Portrait of Bishop Triest, (ca. 1627–30).

Until May 31 2026, the museum hosted a ground-breaking exhibition restoring and showcasing over 150 works exclusively by female artists, of which there were over 40. Figures such as Clara Peeters, Rachel Ruysch and Judith Leyster emerged as commercially successful and critically admired in their time.

== Paintings ==
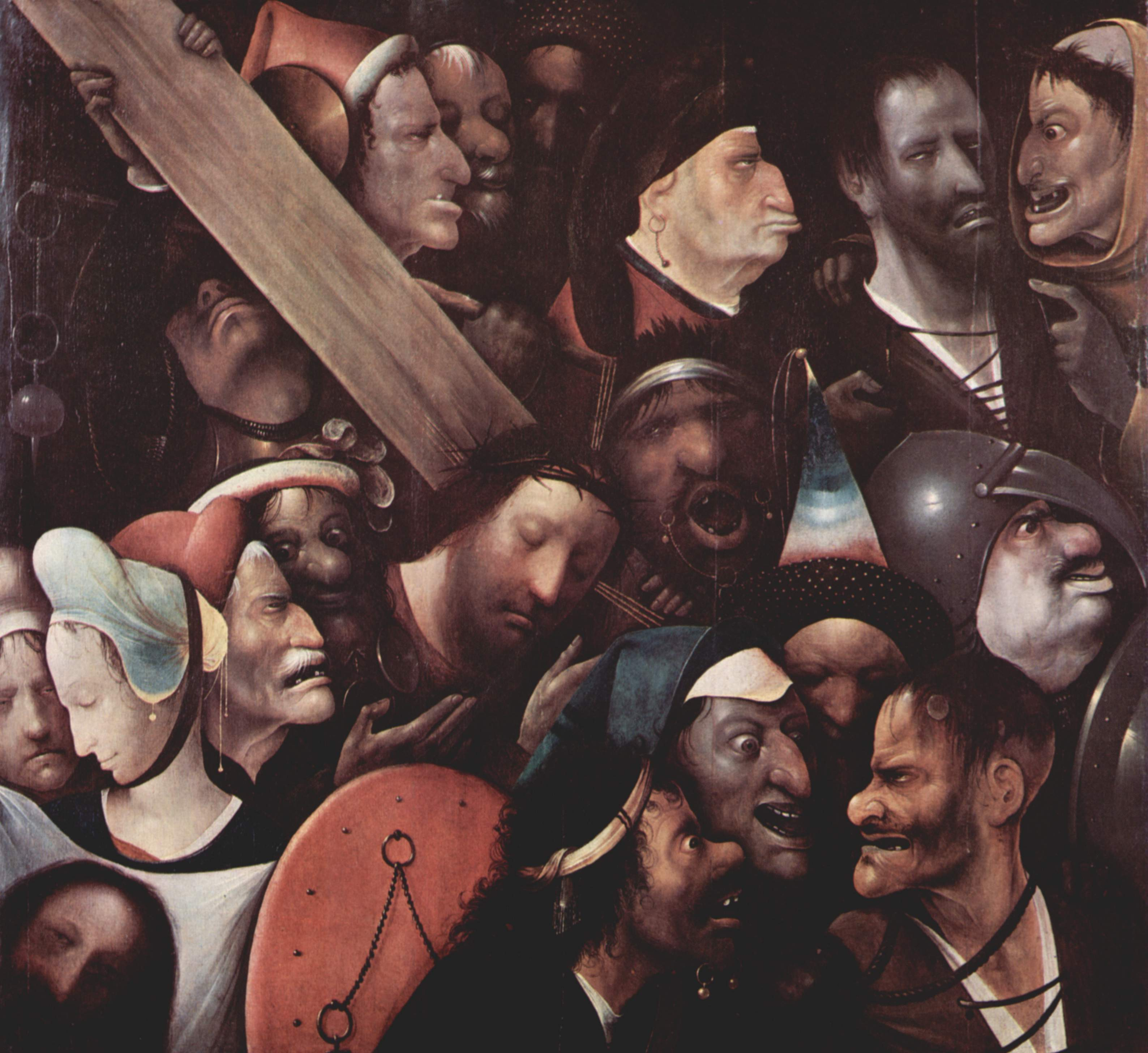
Christ Carrying the Cross by Hieronymus Bosch, part of the permanent collection at the MSK

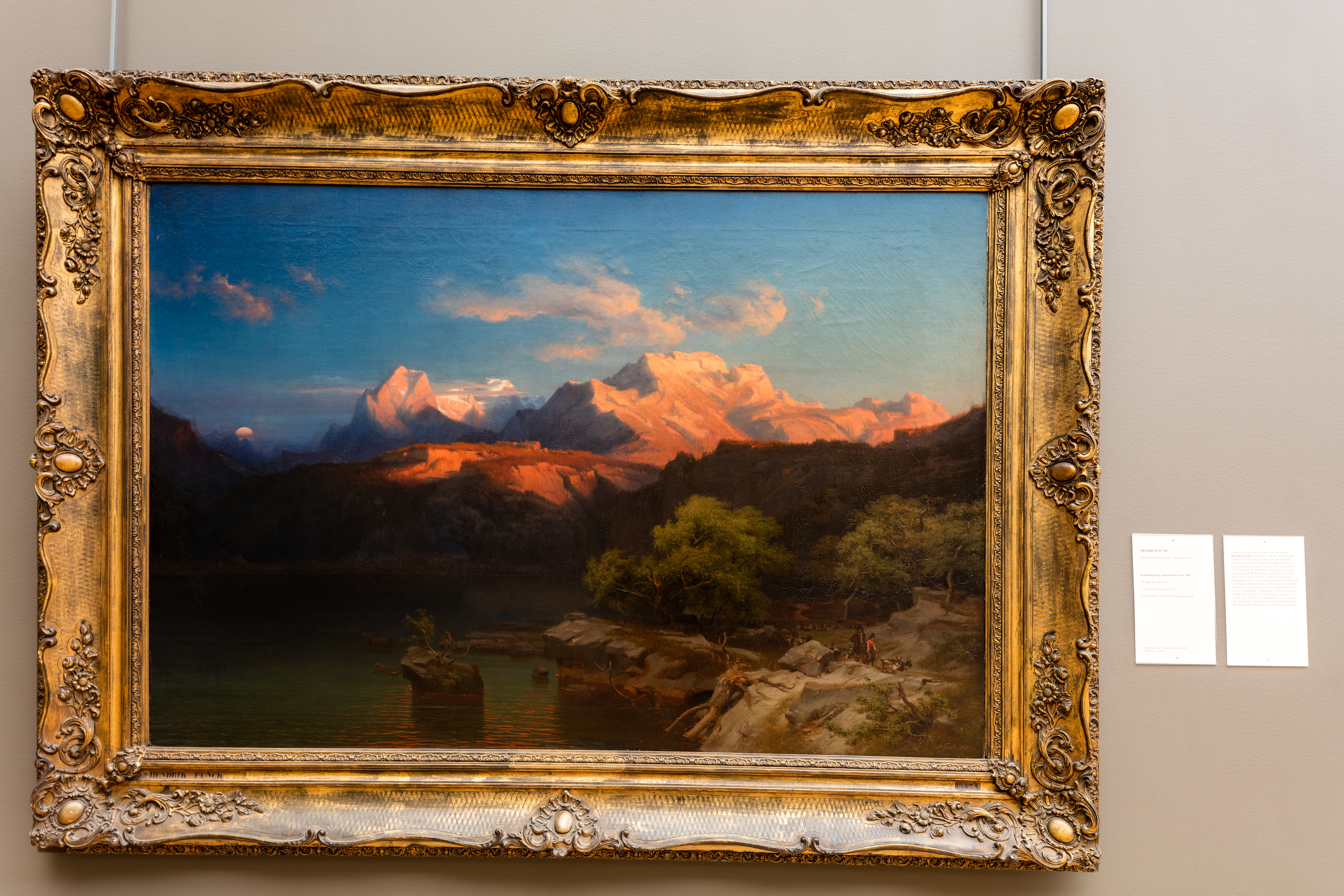
Landscape at Dusk in Tyrol by Heinrich Funk

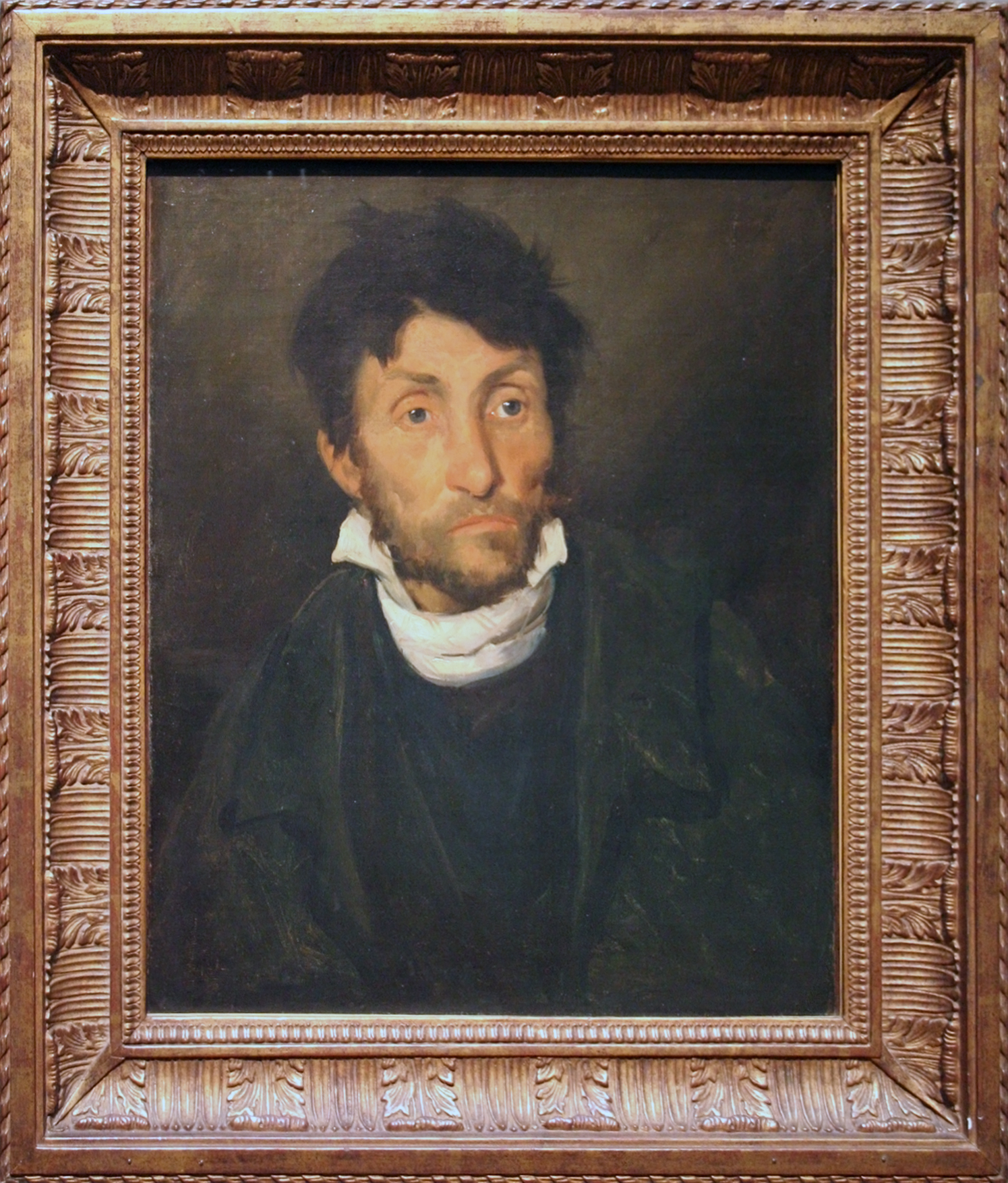
Portrait of a Kleptomaniac by Théodore Géricault

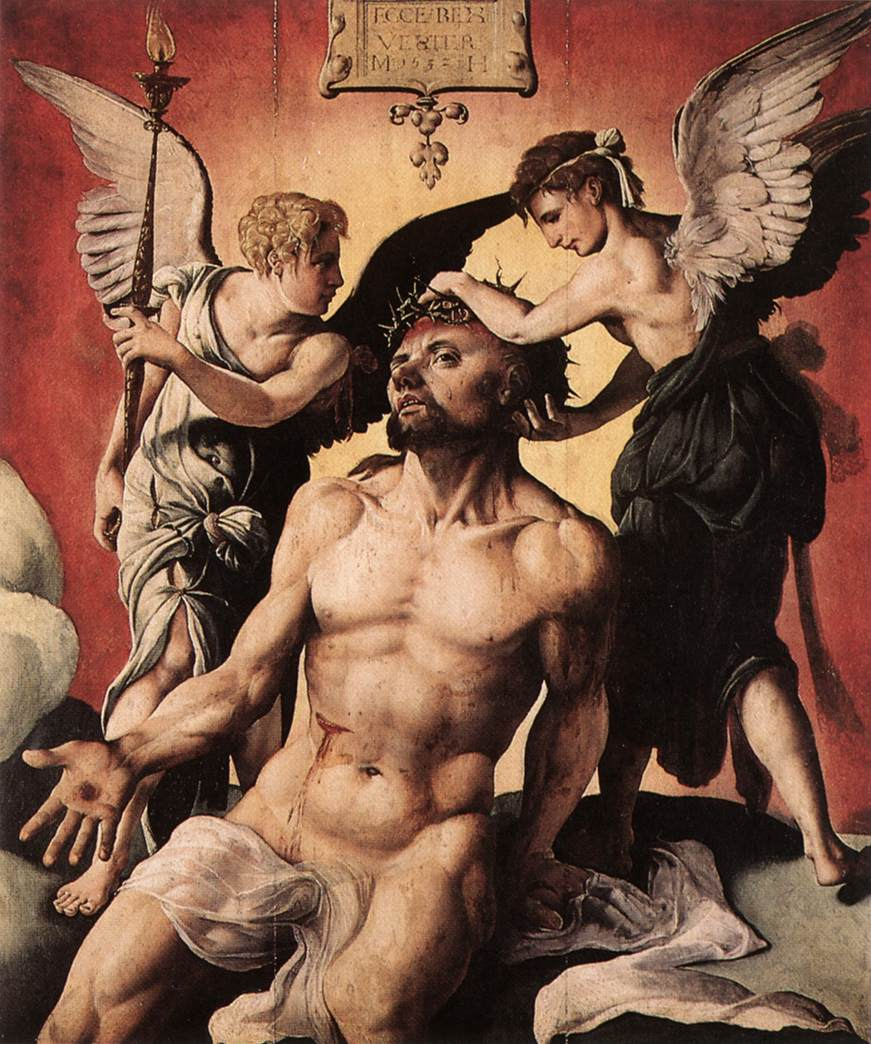
Man of Sorrows by Maarten van Heemskerck

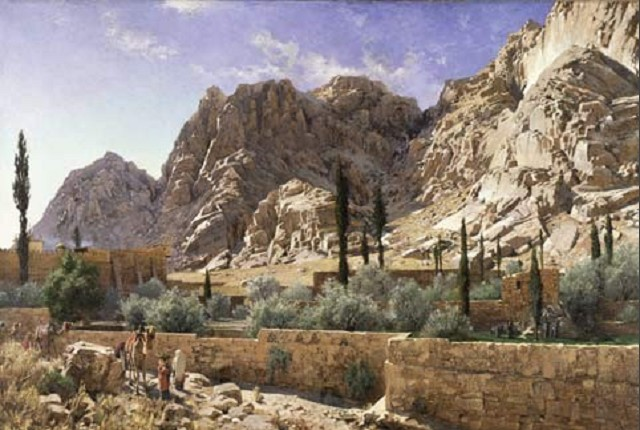
St Katherine Monastery in Sinai by Adolf von Meckel

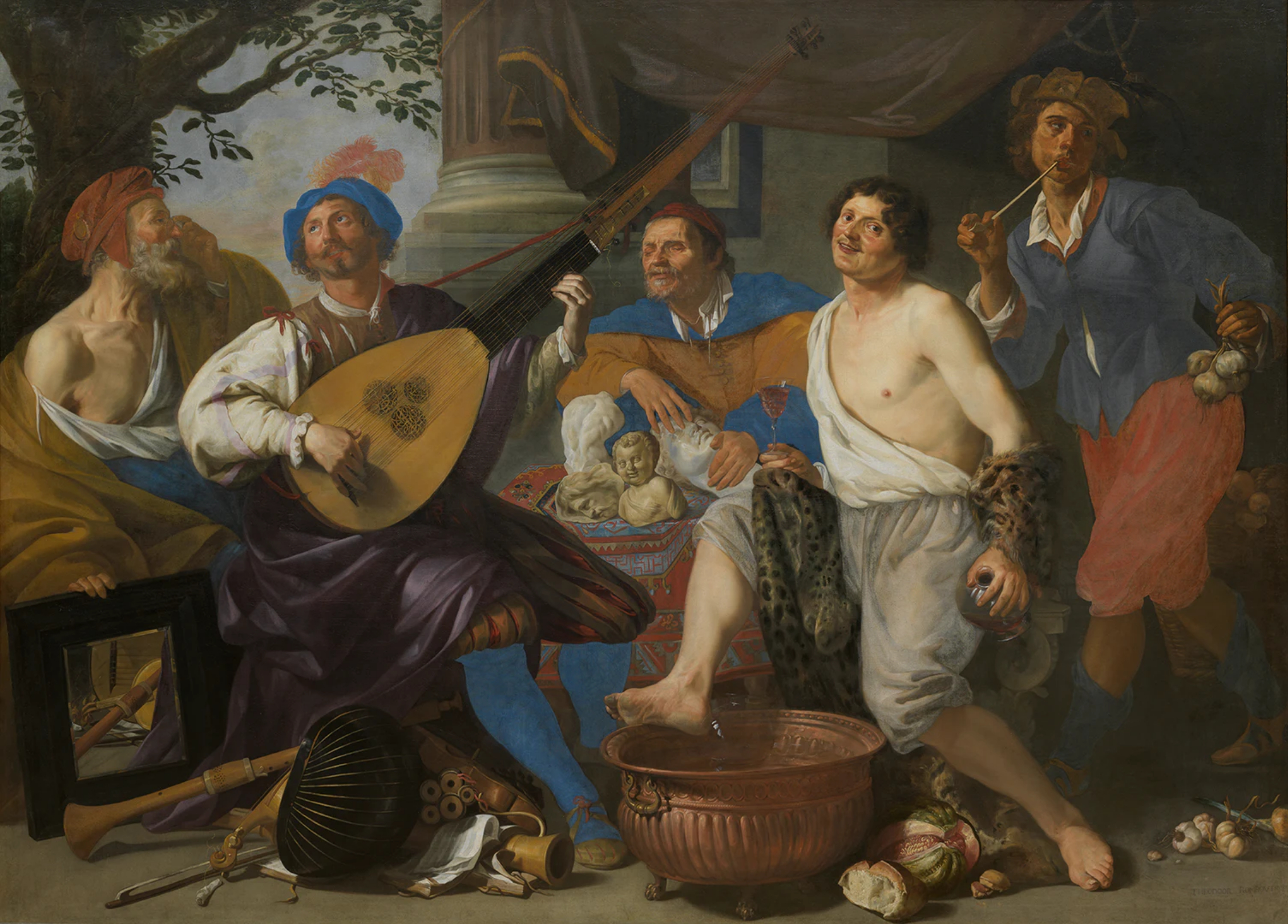
Allegory of the five senses by Theodoor Rombouts

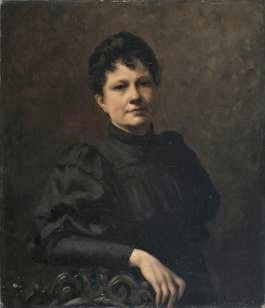
Self-portrait - Emma De Vigne

Source: MSK

- Josse Sébastien van den Abeele - Self Portrait (19th century) MSK
- Abraham van Beijeren - Still Life with Fish (1666) MSK
- Frits Van den Berghe - The Singing Statue (1928) MSK
- Pieter de Bloot - Landscape with a Farmhouse (c.1645) MSK
- Jan Boeckhorst - Apollo and Python (17th century) MSK
- Hieronymus Bosch - St. Jerome at Prayer (c.1485) MSK
- Anna Boch - Cliffs on the Coast of Sanary (1936) MSK
- Hieronymus Bosch - Christ Carrying the Cross (c.1510) MSK
- Ferdinand De Braekeleer the Elder - The Bat (1860) MSK
- Jan de Bray - Portrait of a Young Woman (c.1665) MSK
- Pieter Brueghel the Younger - Wedding Dance in the Open Air (17th century) MSK
- Emile Claus - The Skaters (1891) MSK
- Gaspar de Crayer - The Judgement of Solomon (c.1620) MSK
- Paul Delvaux - The Staircase (1946) MSK
- Gustave Den Duyts - Panoramic View of Ghent (c.1881) MSK
- Anthony van Dyck - Jupiter and Antiope (c.1620) MSK
- Henri Evenepoel - The Spaniard in Paris /Portrait of the Painter Francisco Iturrino (1899) MSK
- James Ensor - Children at their Morning Toilet (1886) MSK
- Léon Frédéric - The Funeral Meal (1886) MSK
- Heinrich Funk - Landscape at Dusk in Tyrol (1847) MSK
- Théodore Géricault - Portrait of a Kleptomaniac (c.1820) MSK'
- Jan Pauwel Gillemans the Elder - Still Life with Vegetables and Fruits MSK
- James Guthrie - Schoolmates (1884) MSK
- Cornelis de Heem - Still Life with Flowers and Fruits (1670) MSK
- Maarten van Heemskerck - Man of Sorrows (1532) MSK
- Maarten van Heemskerck - Calvary (1543) MSK
- Jacob Jordaens - The Judgement of Midas (17th century) MSK
- Fernand Khnopff - Incense (1898) MSK
- Urbanus Leyniers - The Glorification of Apollo (1717) MSK
- Léon Augustin Lhermitte - The Grandmother (1880) MSK
- Nicolaes Maes - Portrait of a Woman (1663) MSK
- Alessandro Magnasco Praying Monks (18th century) MSK
- René Magritte - Perspective II, Manet's Balcony (1950) MSK
- Harrington Mann - Kathleen (1906) MSK
- Adolf Meckel von Hemsbach - The St Catherine Monastery in the Sinai (19th century) MSK
- Paula Modersohn-Becker - Girl in a Birch Forest (1903) MSK
- Jenny Montigny - The Gardener (20th Century) MSK
- Joseph Paelinck - The Beautiful Anthia Leading her Companions into the Temple of Diana in Ephesus (1820) MSK
- Fanny Paelinck-Horgnies - The Saint Cecilia (1829) MSK
- Constant Permeke - Ostend Harbour (c.1913) MSK
- Nicolas de Plattemontagne - Portrait of a Young Man (17th century) MSK
- Ramah - The Painter (1922) MSK
- Hubert van Ravesteyn - Still Life with a Pipe, Nuts, a Pitcher and a Tobacco Pouch (1670) MSK
- Petrus Johannes van Reysschoot - The Meet (1743) MSK
- Peter Paul Rubens - The Flagellation of Christ (1617) MSK
- Peter Paul Rubens - Saint Francis Receiving the Stigmata (c.1633) MSK
- Théo van Rysselberghe - The Lecture by Emile Verhaeren, 1903 (1903) MSK
- Theodoor Rombouts - Allegory of the Five Senses (1632) MSK
- Theodoor Rombouts - Allegory of the Second Bench of Aldermen of ‘Gedele’ (c.1627) MSK
- Hugo Salmson - Visiting the Tenant Farmer (19th century) MSK
- Gustave De Smet - The Good House (1926) MSK
- Leon De Smet - Interior or A Loving Couple (1911) MSK
- Léon Spilliaert - Silhouette of the Artist (1907) MSK
- Léon Spilliaert - The Second of November (Interior) (1908) MSK
- Alfred Stevens - Mary-Magdalene (1887) MSK
- Tintoretto - Portrait of Giovanni Paolo Cornaro (1561) MSK
- Prosper de Troyer - With the Birds (1928) MSK
- Edgard Tytgat - Invitation to Paradise (1922) MSK
- Edgard Tytgat - The Last Doll (1923) MSK
- Edgard Tytgat - Four Nude Girls in a Boat (1950) MSK
- Lodewijk de Vadder - The Soignes Forest with Market Vendors (17th century) MSK
- Frans Verhas - The Lion (1874) MSK
- Pierre Joseph Verhaghen - The Presentation of Christ in the Temple (1767) MSK
- Cornelis de Vos - Family Portrait (1630) MSK
- Anna De Weert - My Studio in June, 1909-1910 (1909–10) MSK
- Liévin De Winne - Portrait of the Sculptor Paul De Vigne (19th century) MSK
- Gustave Van de Woestyne - Still Life (c.1922) MSK
- Carel Willink Het evenwicht der krachten Equilibrium of forces (1963)
- Anders Zorn - With Mother (1895) MSK
- Puccio di Simone - Coronation of Virgin (c.1350) MSK

== See also ==
- Stedelijk Museum voor Actuele Kunst
- Royal Museum of Fine Arts
- Royal Museums of Fine Arts of Belgium
