= Saint Francis Receiving the Stigmata (Rubens) =

Painting by Peter Paul Rubens

- Franciscus van Assisi ontvangt de stigmata (Dutch)
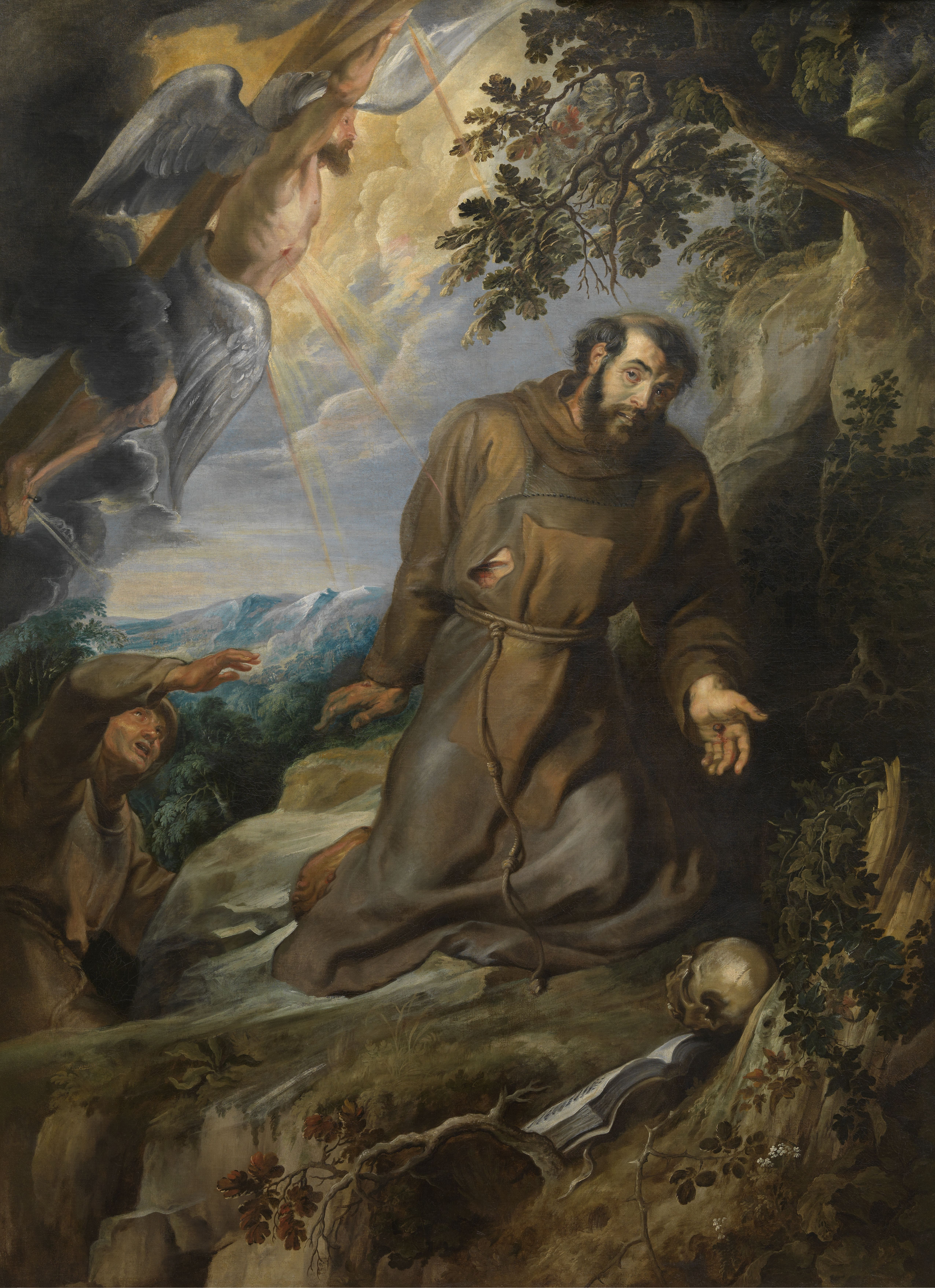
- Artist: Peter Paul Rubens
- Year: circa 1633
- Catalogue: Inv. S-9
- Medium: Oil on canvas
- Movement: Flemish Baroque
- Dimensions: 265.5 cm × 193 cm (104.5 in × 75.9 in)
- Location: Museum of Fine Arts, Ghent, Ghent
- Website: www.mskgent.be/en/collection/s-9

Saint Francis Receiving the Stigmata is an oil painting on canvas by Peter Paul Rubens. It was originally produced as an altarpiece for the Franciscan Recollects Church in Ghent. The church also housed other works by Rubens, including St Mary Magdalene in Ecstasy and The Virgin Mary and Saint Francis Saving the World from Christ's Anger.

In 1797 the painting was seized from Saint Peter's Abbey, Ghent to form part of a new 'Nationaal Museum', which opened to the public in 1802. It now hangs in the Museum of Fine Arts, Ghent.
