= Man of Sorrows (Heemskerck) =

Painting by Maarten van Heemskerck

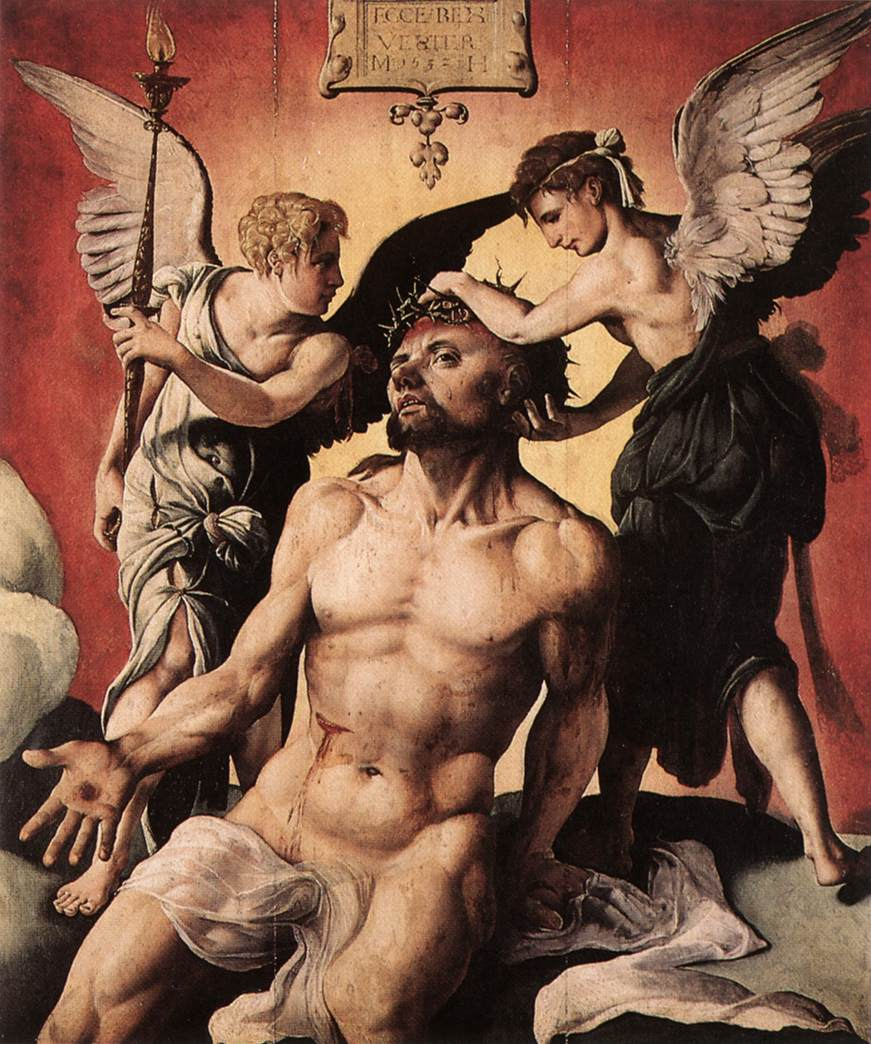
- Artist: Maarten van Heemskerck
- Year: 1532
- Medium: oil on panel
- Dimensions: 84.2 cm × 72.5 cm (33.1 in × 28.5 in)
- Location: Museum of Fine Arts, Ghent, Ghent

The Man of Sorrows is a 1532 painting by the Dutch Golden Age painter Maarten van Heemskerck in the collection of the Museum of Fine Arts, Ghent. It is one of many images in Christian art of the Man of Sorrows, a representation of Christ naked above the waist with the wounds of his Passion prominently displayed.

The subject depicts Christ after the crucifixion, attended by angels, with bleeding wounds displayed, wearing the crown of thorns and a loincloth. The loincloth is claimed to be wrapped around an erection, visible to some art historians but not others. Van Heemskerck is not the only Renaissance artist allegedly to depict Christ with an erection (ostentatio genitalium), which some scholars interpret as a symbol of his resurrection and continuing power.

Other versions of Christ crowned with thorns by Heemskerck are:

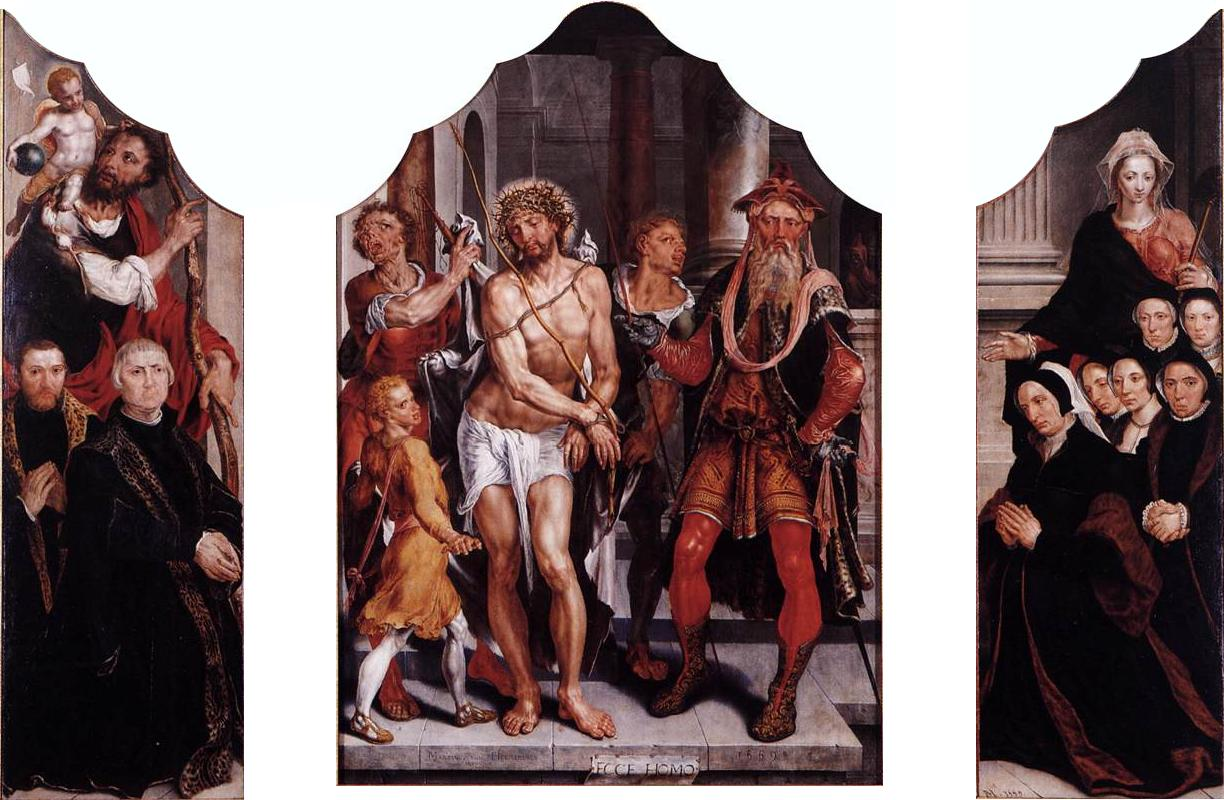
Triptych Ecce Homo

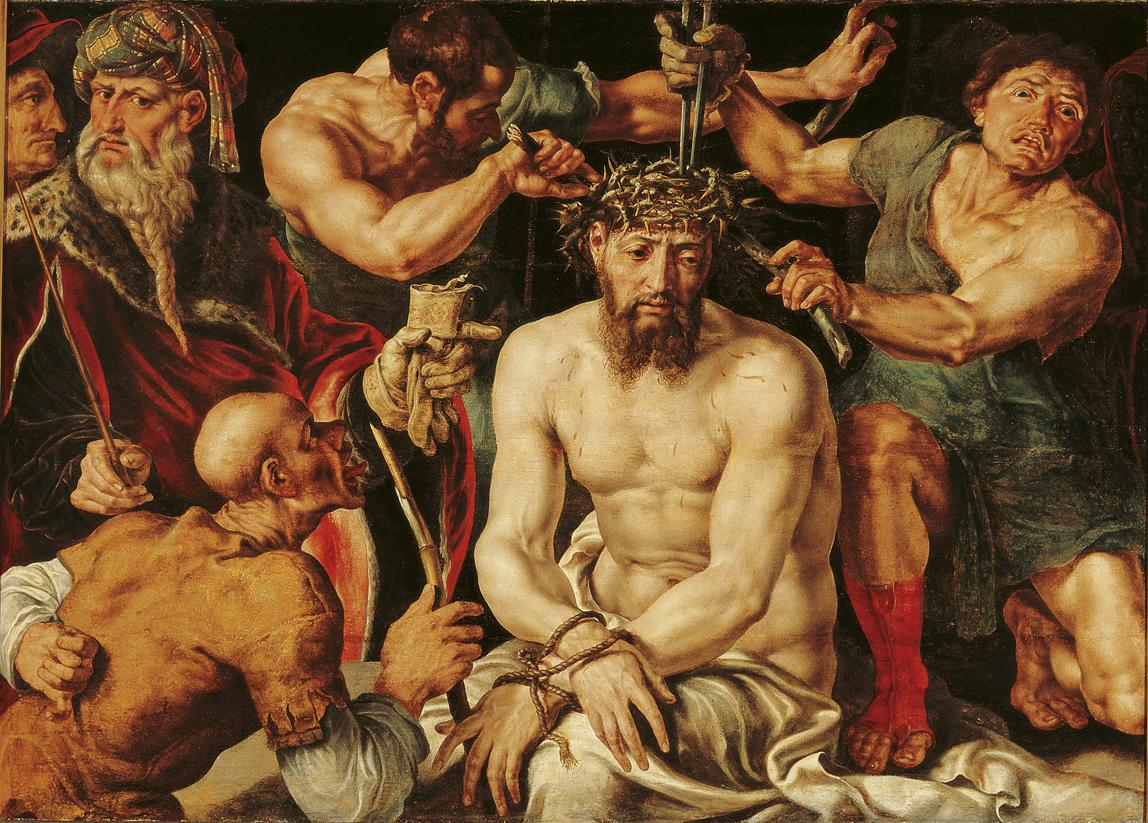
Christ Crowned with Thorns

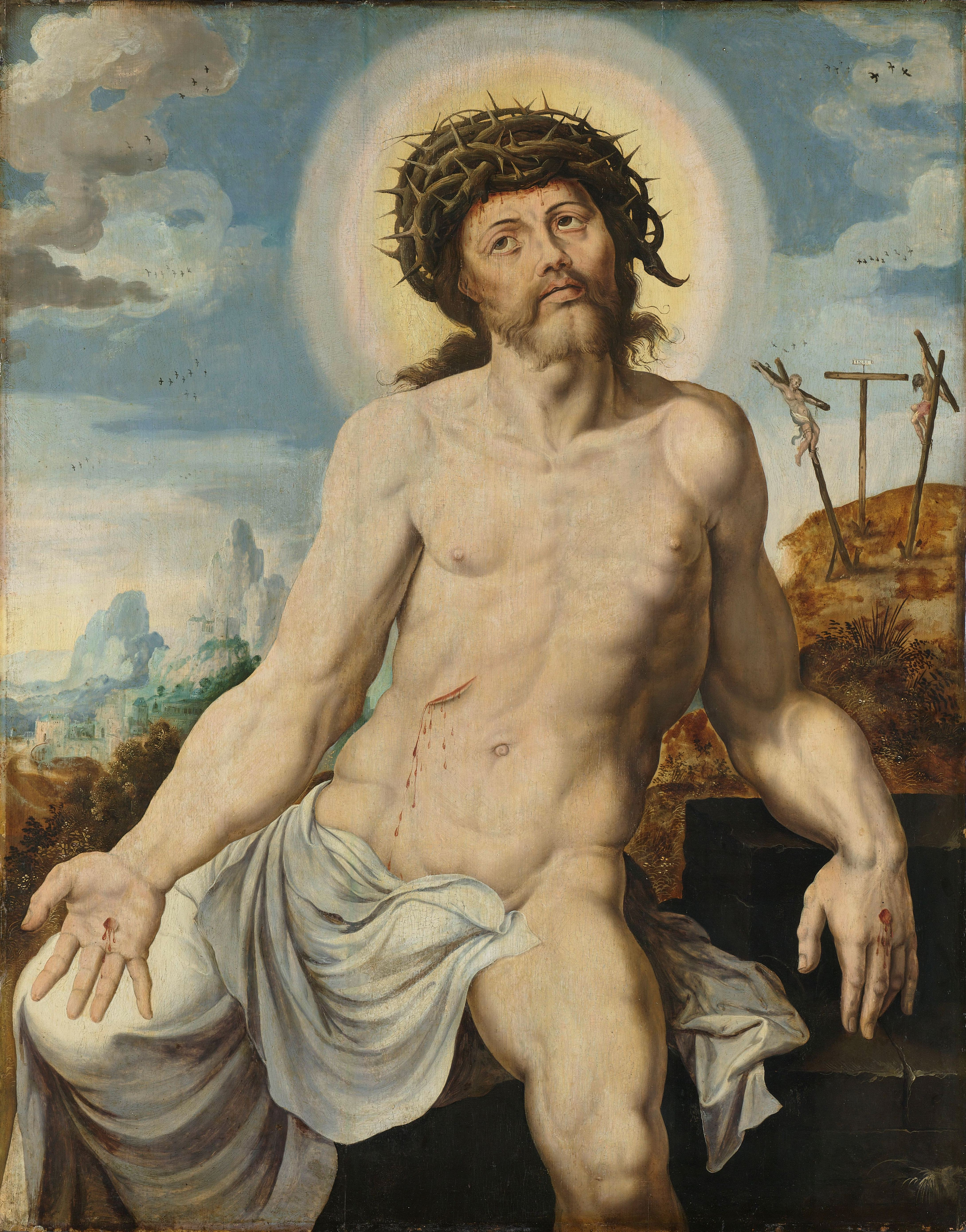
Christ as Man of Sorrows

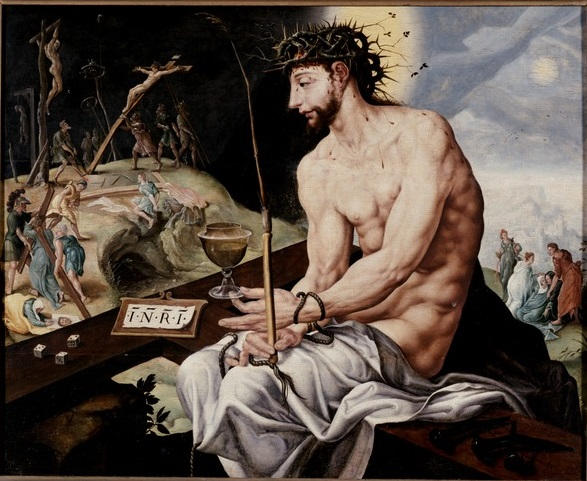
Christ in Agony
