= Christ Crowned with Thorns (Heemskerck) =

Painting by Maarten van Heemskerck

Christ crowned with thorns
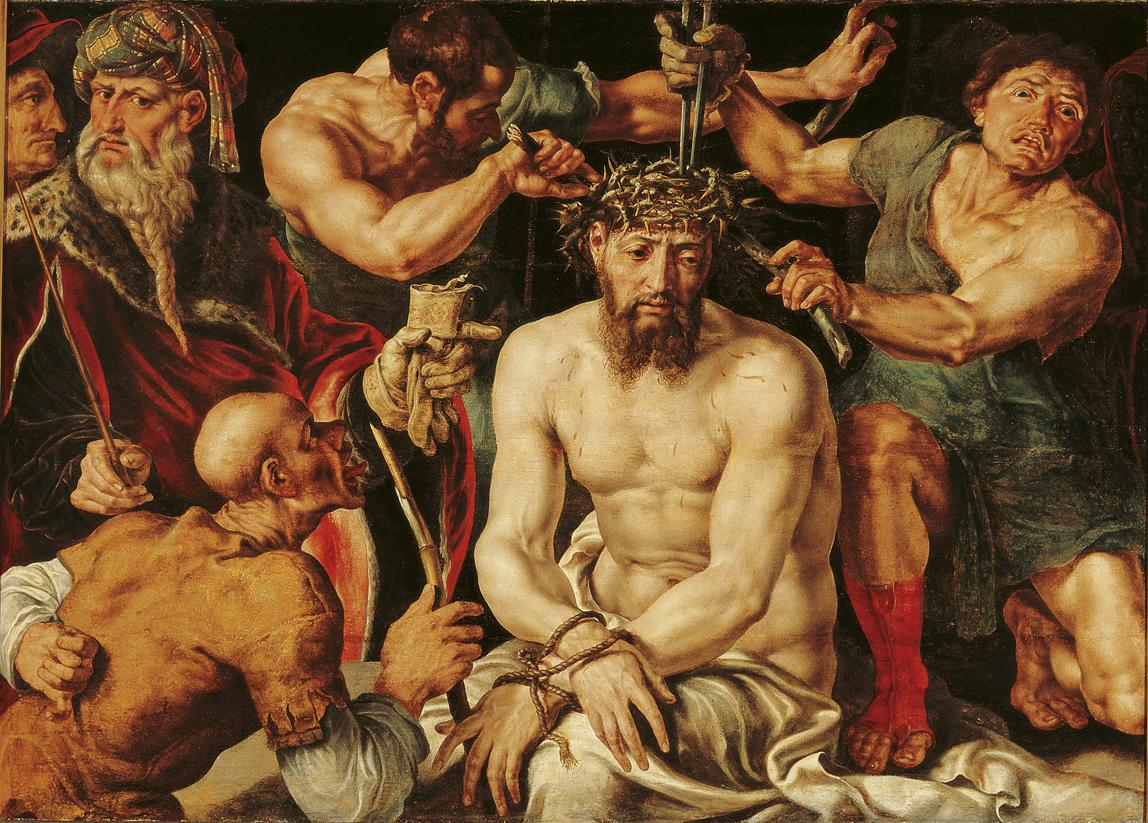
- Artist: Maarten van Heemskerck
- Year: c. 1550
- Medium: oil paint, canvas
- Subject: Crowning of Jesus with thorns
- Dimensions: 99 cm (39 in) × 138.5 cm (54.5 in)
- Location: Frans Hals Museum
- Accession: os I-138

Christ Crowned with Thorns is a c. 1550 painting by the Dutch painter Maarten van Heemskerck in the collection of the Frans Hals Museum, in Haarlem.

The subject depicts Christ before the crucifixion being mocked by soldiers, who are fixing the crown of thorns to his head. It was commissioned by the Church of Delft where it hung until 1625 when it was removed and placed in the town hall for being "too Catholic". It was sold 24 April 1860, when it was purchased by Jonkheer Jan Six of Hillegom. He in turn gave it to the museum in 1871.

Other versions of Christ crowned with thorns by Heemskerck are:

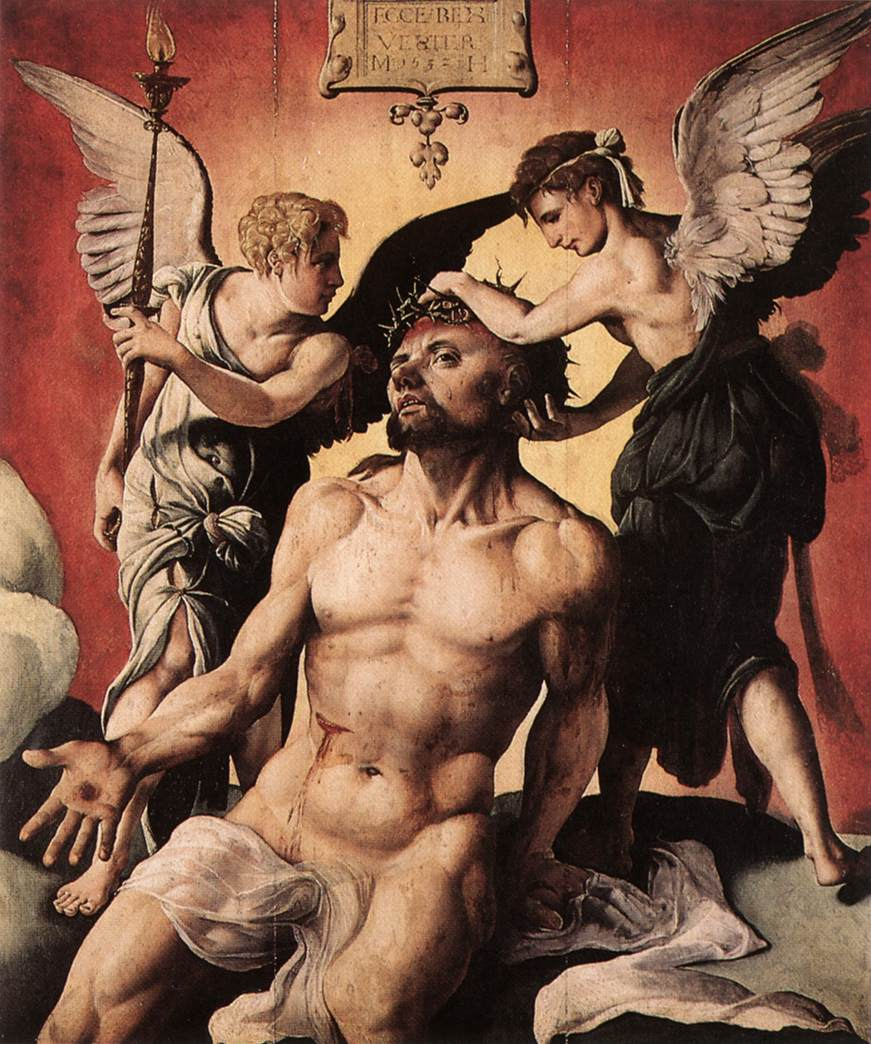
Man of Sorrows

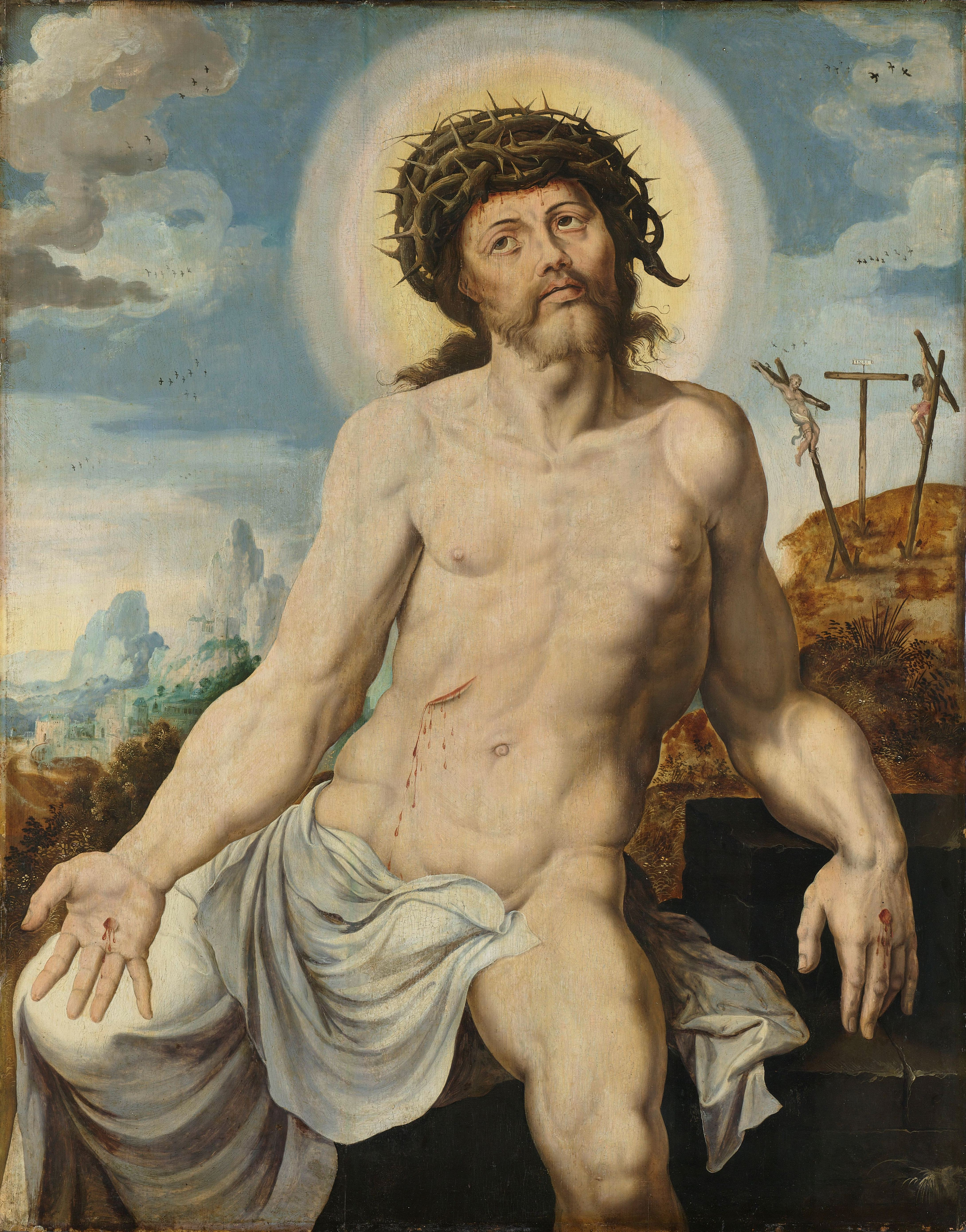
Christ as Man of Sorrows

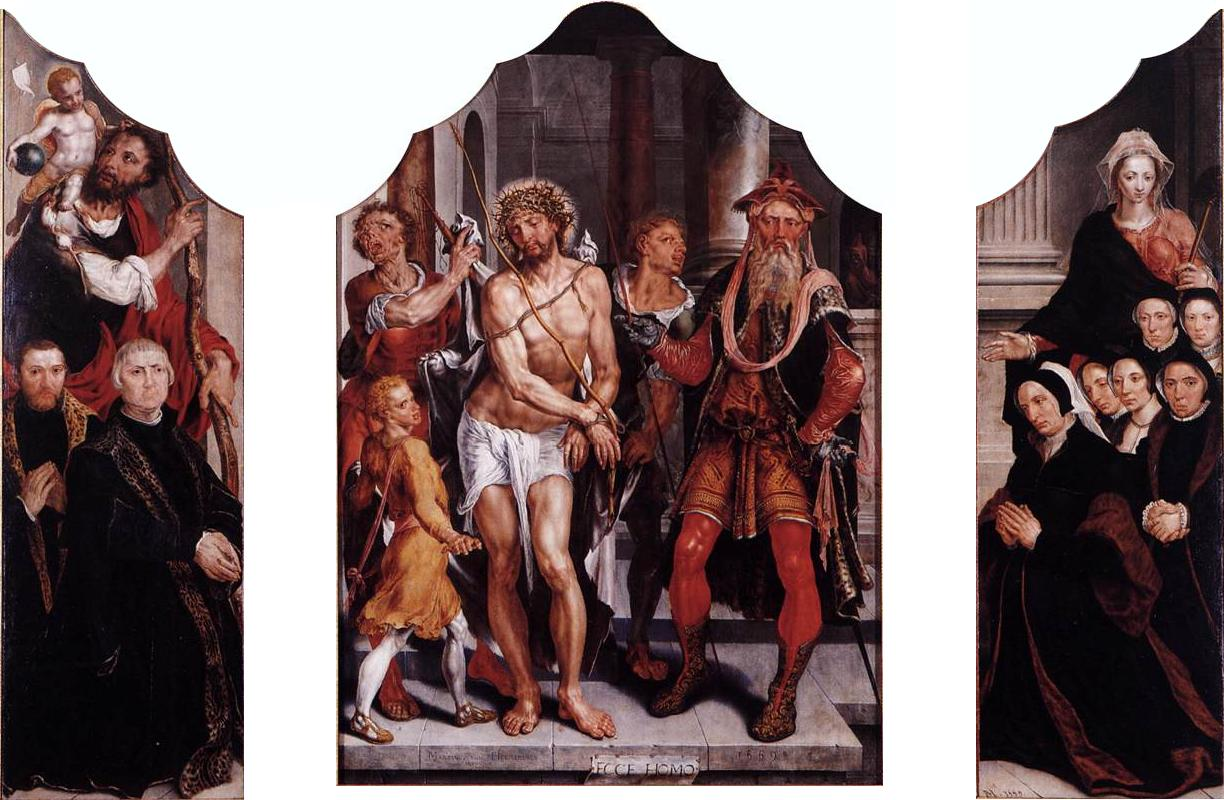
Triptych Ecce Homo

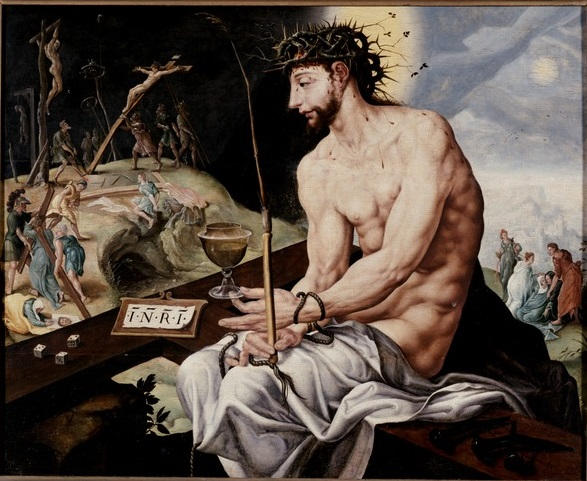
Christ in Agony

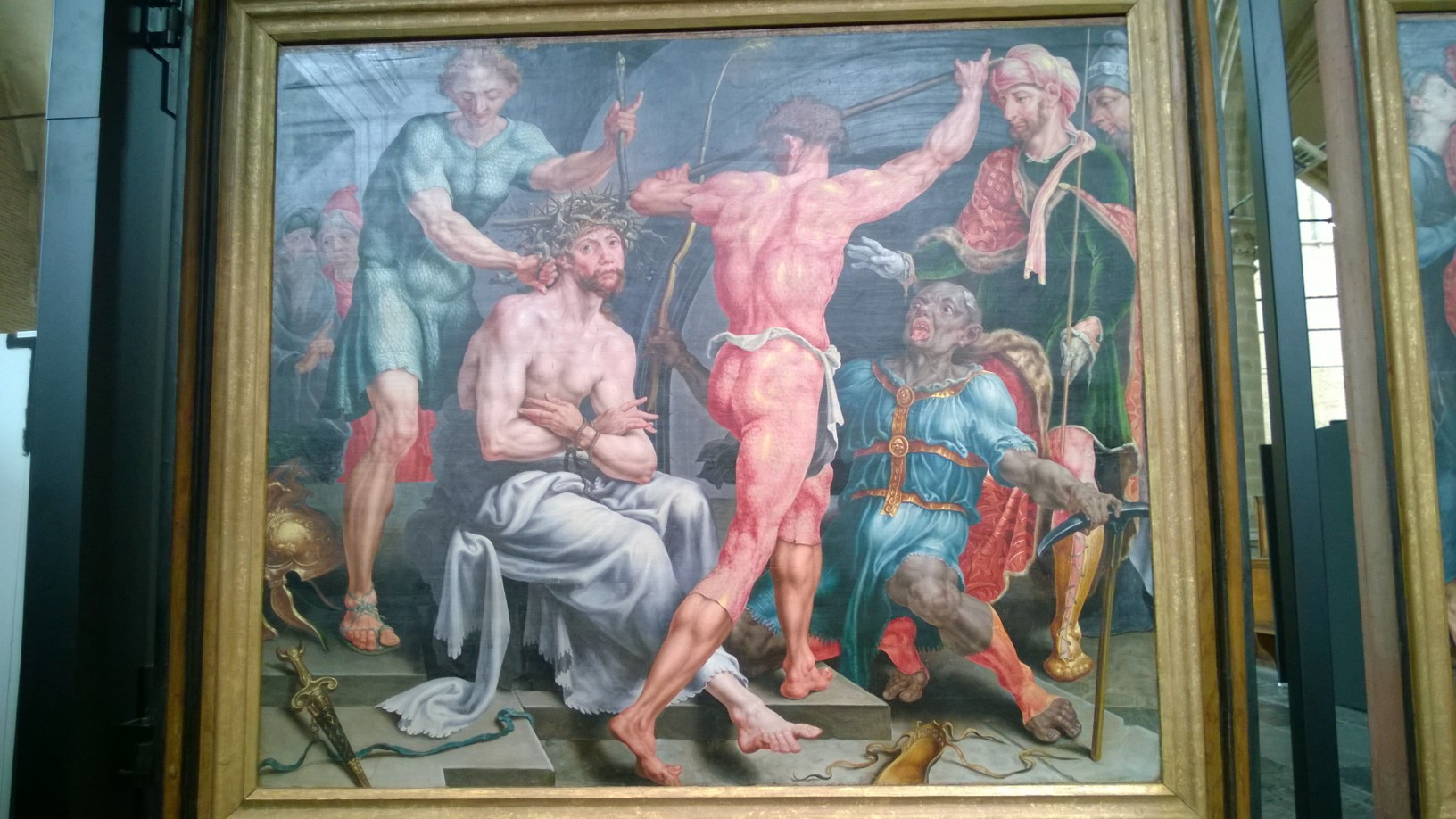
Part of the Linkoping polyptych
