= Saints Dominic and Francis Saving the World from Christ's Anger =

1620 painting by Peter Paul Rubens

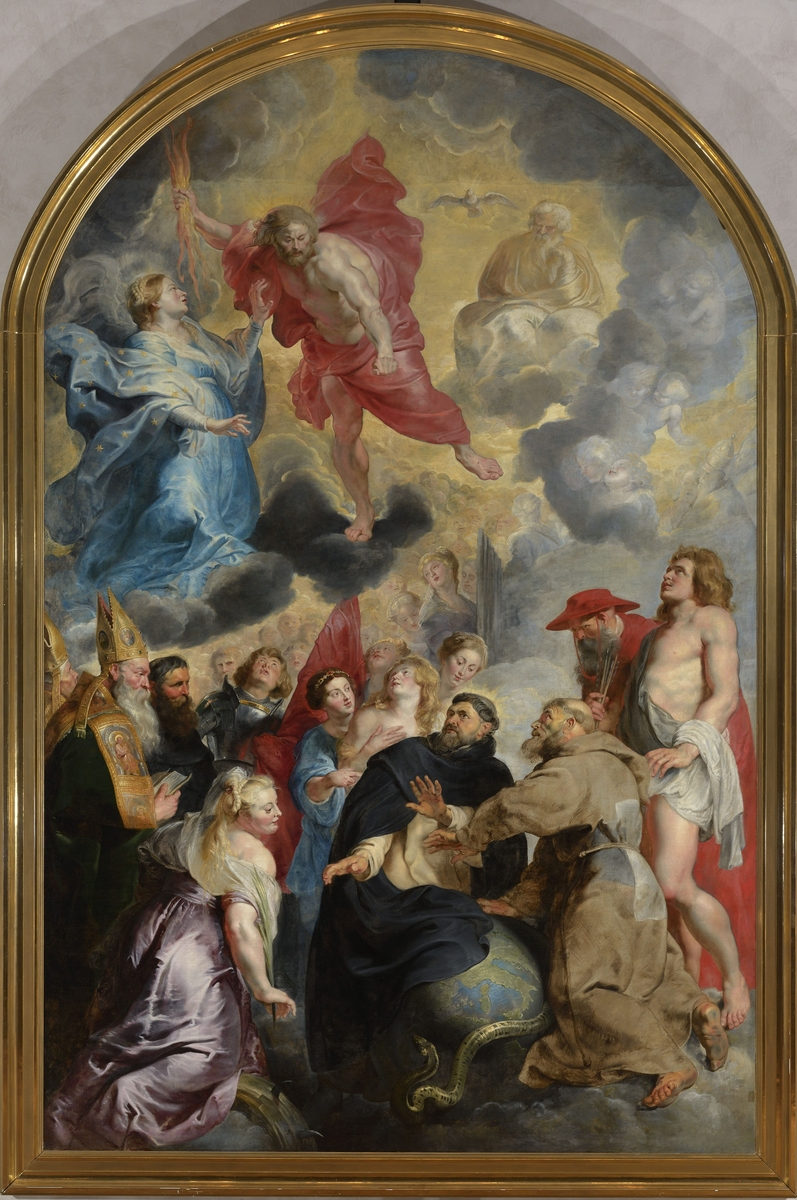
Saints Dominic and Francis Saving the World from Christ's Anger (1620) by Rubens

Saints Dominic and Francis Saving the World from Christ's Anger is an oil on canvas painting by Peter Paul Rubens, executed in 1620, now in the Museum of Fine Arts of Lyon. It is linked to his similar work The Virgin Mary and Saint Francis Saving the World from Christ's Anger (Brussels).
