= The Virgin Mary and Saint Francis Saving the World from Christ's Anger =

Painting by Peter Paul Rubens and studio

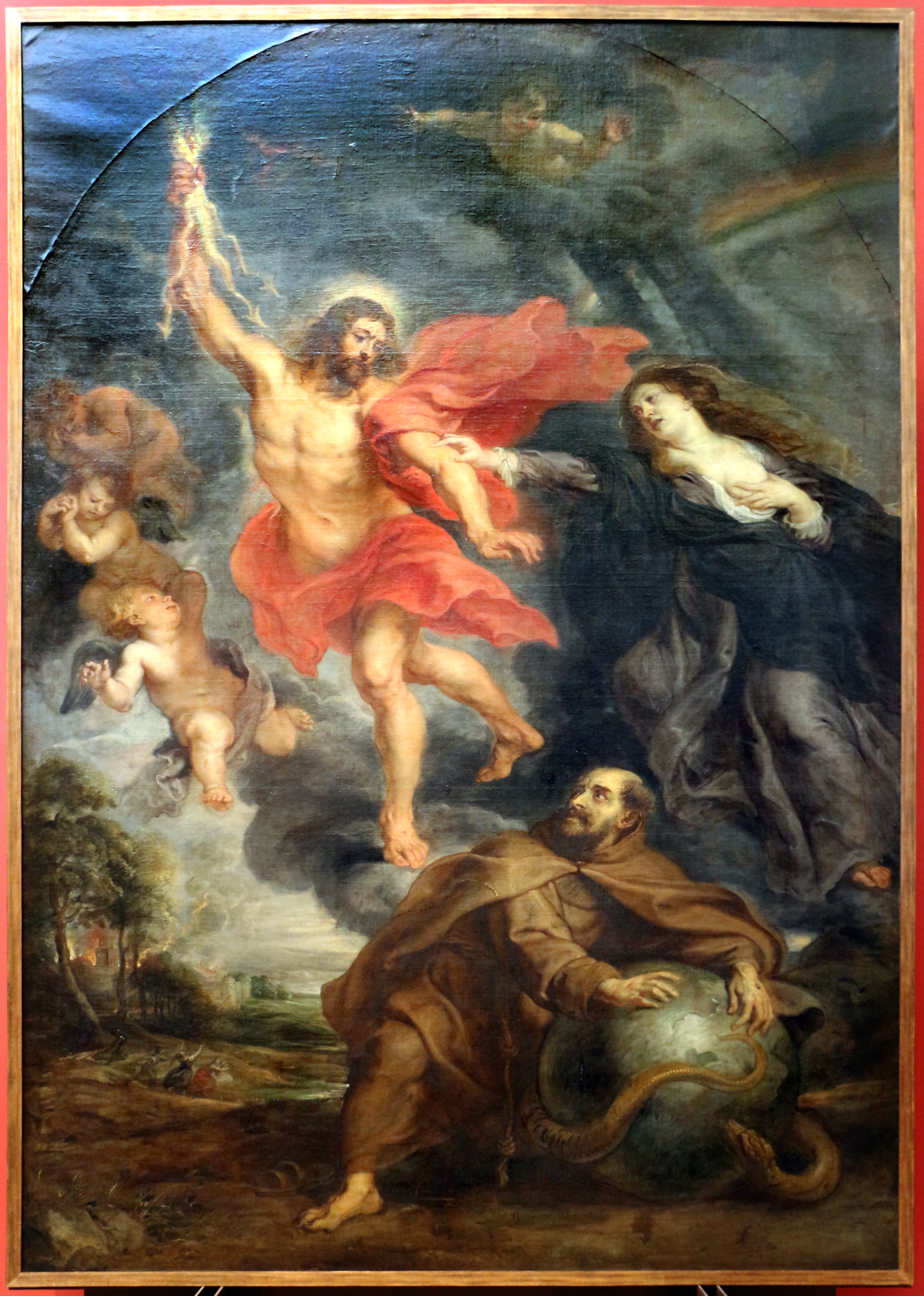
The Virgin Mary and Saint Francis Saving the World from Christ's Anger (c. 1614) by Peter Paul Rubens and studio

The Virgin Mary and Saint Francis Saving the World from Christ's Anger is a work by Peter Paul Rubens and his studio, created c. 1614. It is linked to his Saints Dominic and Francis Saving the World from Christ's Anger (Lyon). It is now in the Royal Museum of Fine Arts of Belgium in Brussels.

== Sources ==
- "Catalogue entry".
