= Adolf Meckel von Hemsbach =

German landscape painter

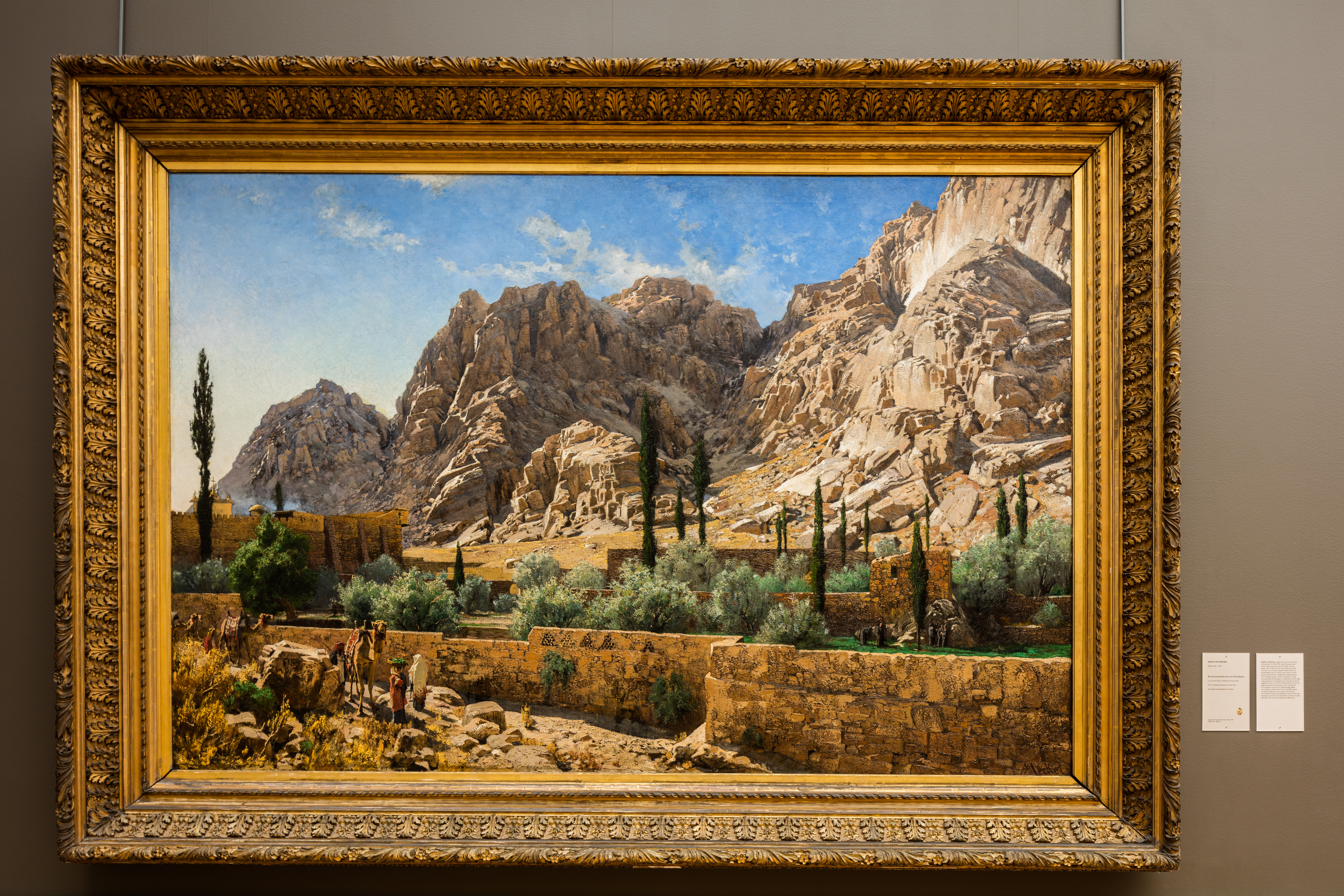
St Catherine Monastery in the Sinai by Adolf Meckel

Adolf Meckel von Hemsbach (17 February 1856 – 24 May 1893) was a German landscape painter. In the early 1880s, he visited the Arab world and painted a number of oriental scenes. He visited St. Catherine's Monastery at the foot of Mount Sinai, and depicted it in an oil painting.

Meckel attended the Great Berlin Art Exhibition in 1893 with four paintings, but a fifth one was rejected. He took his own life in Berlin later that same year.

== Biography ==
He was born in Berlin, the son of a professor of pathological anatomy, Johann Heinrich Meckel von Hemsbach (1821-1856) and his wife Theophile von Denffer (1824-1902). After the early death of his father, he spent his childhood with the maternal grandparents in St. Petersburg, Russia. He attended high school in Stuttgart, where he had his first drawing lessons, and then studied painting at the Karlsruhe Academy of Fine Arts under Hans Fredrik Gude.

In the years 1880-1881 he visited a number of Arab countries with fellow artists Eugen Bracht and Carl Coven Schirm. Among other places, he visited St. Catherine's Monastery at the foot of Mount Sinai, which he recorded in oils. In addition to landscapes, he painted a number of oriental scenes. On his return he was initially based in Karlsruhe, but then moved back to Berlin in 1892.

Back in Berlin Meckel was represented regularly at the exhibitions of the Academy of Arts, Berlin and the Great Berlin Art Exhibitions, as well as in the Munich Glass Palace, Dresden, Stuttgart and Vienna. A list of over 100 of Meckel's works was catalogued by F. von Boetticher.

Meckel attended the Great Berlin Art Exhibition in 1893 with four paintings, but a fifth was rejected. He took his own life in Berlin later that same year.

== Selected works ==
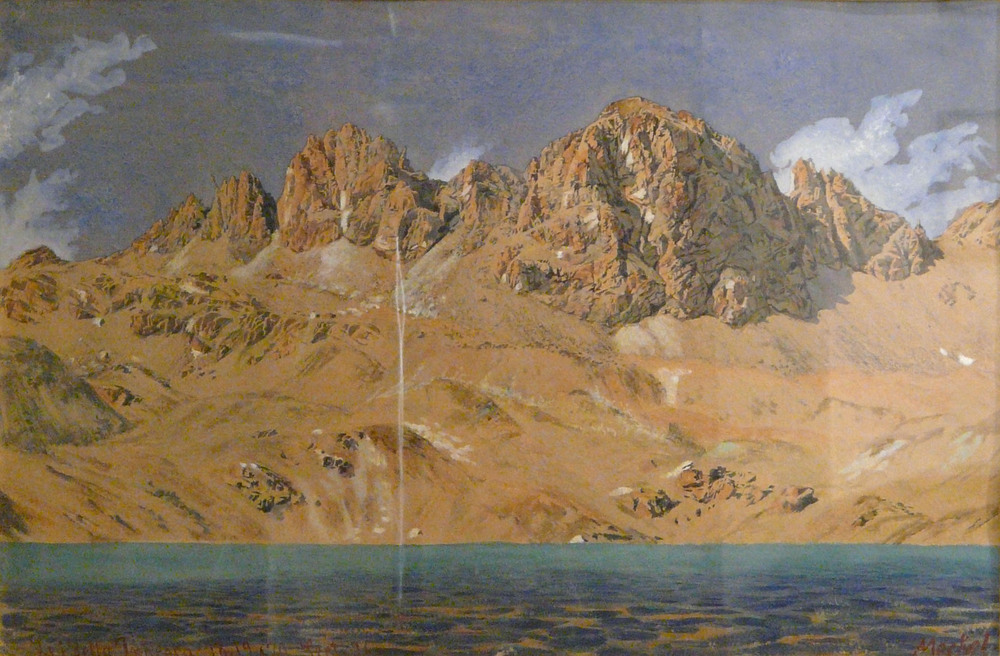
Tscheppasee im Engadin, 1876

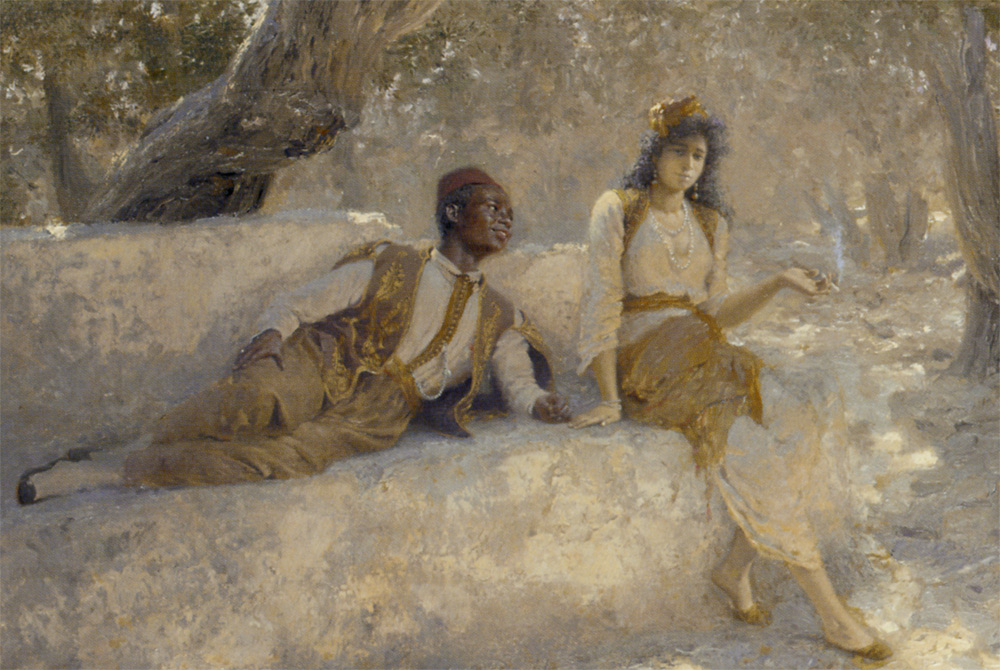
Oriental scene

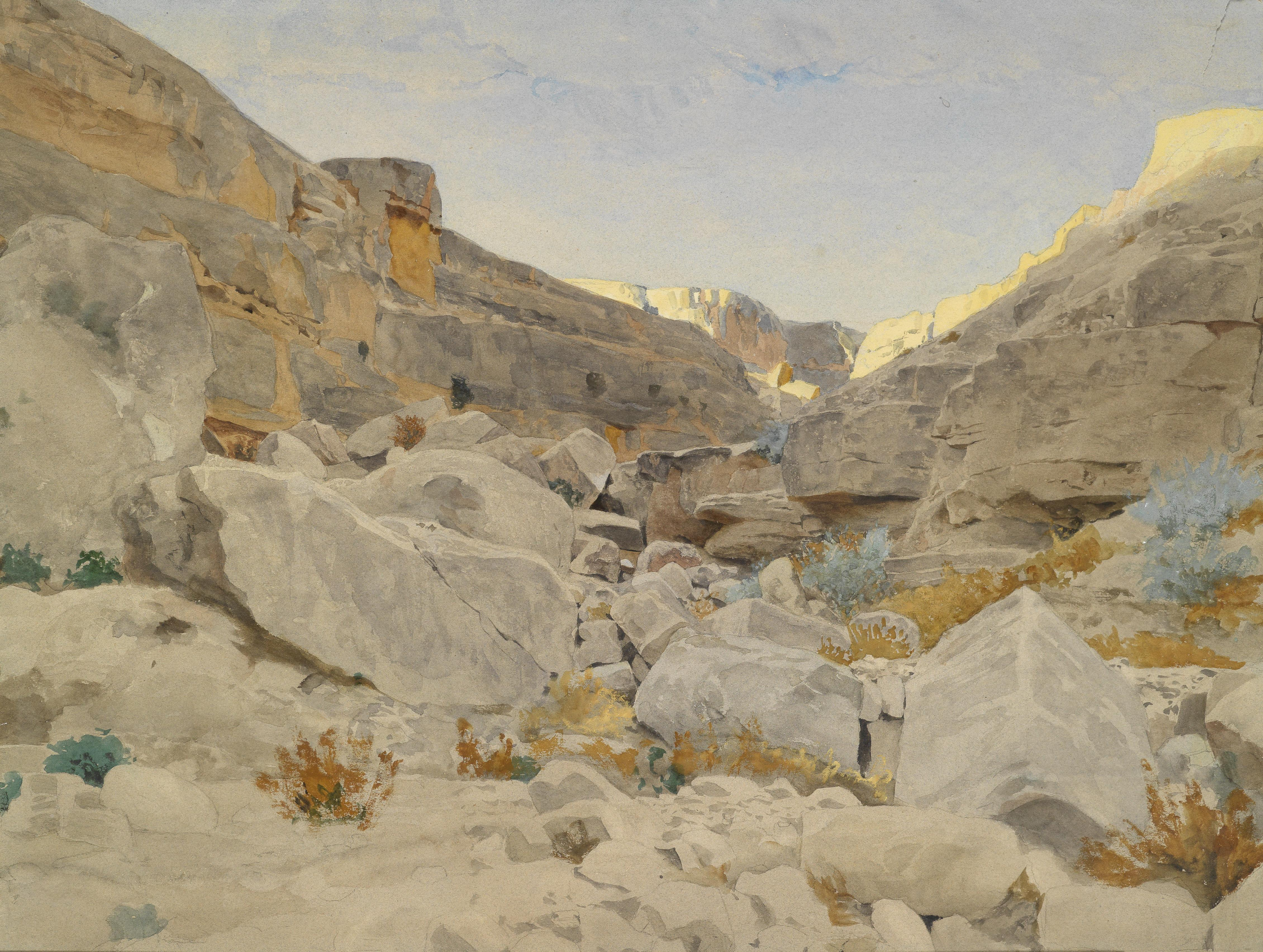
Landscape in Sinai

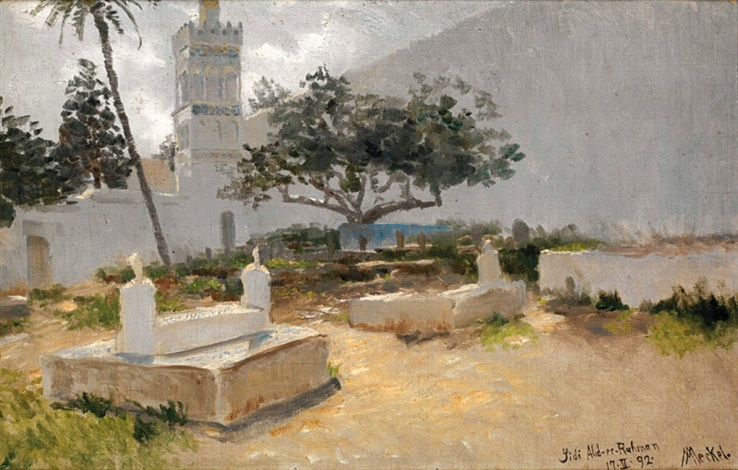
View of the Mosque at Sidi Abderrahman, 1892

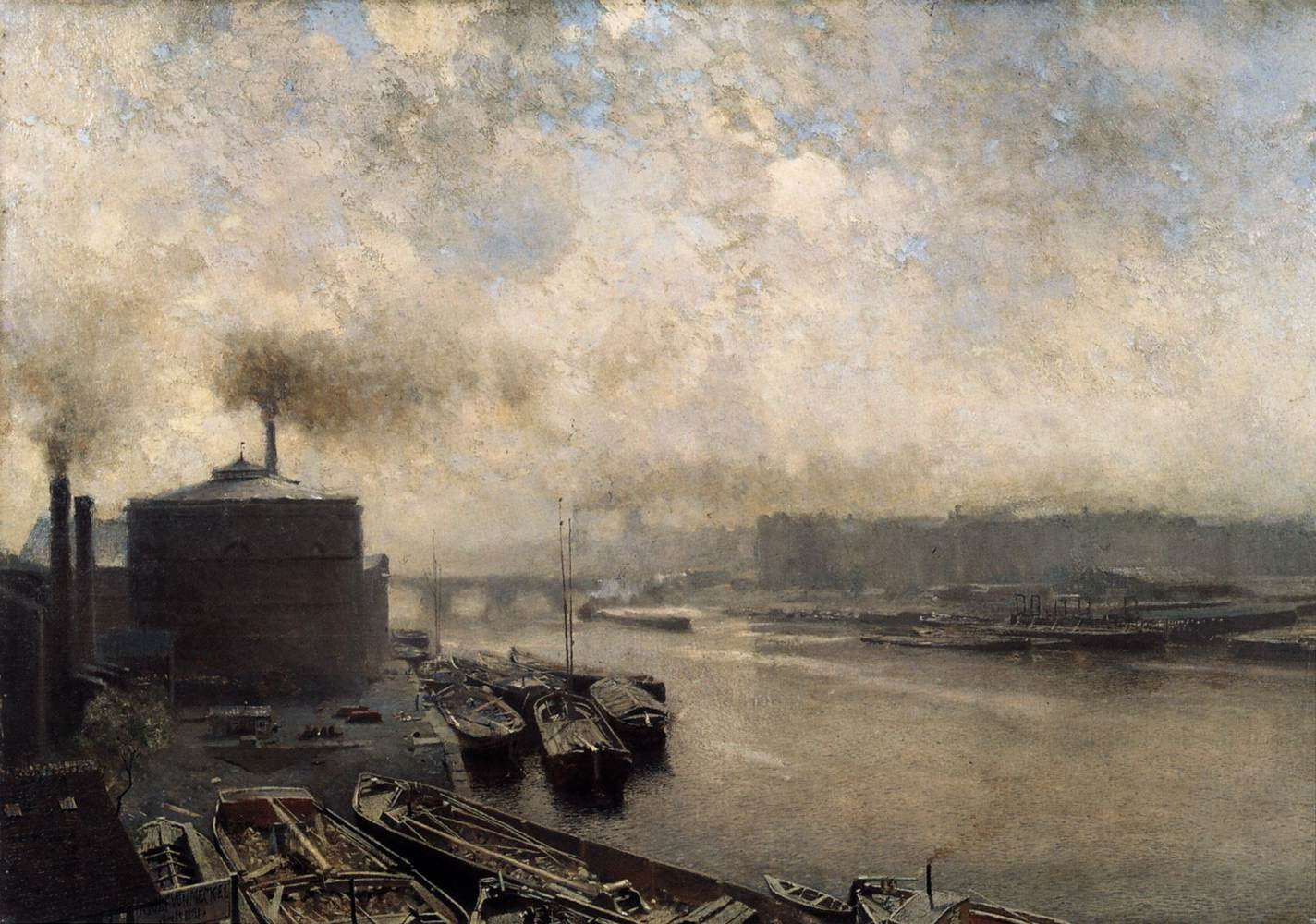
British Gas Works on the River Spree, Berlin
