= St Mary Magdalene in Ecstasy =

Painting by Peter Paul Rubens

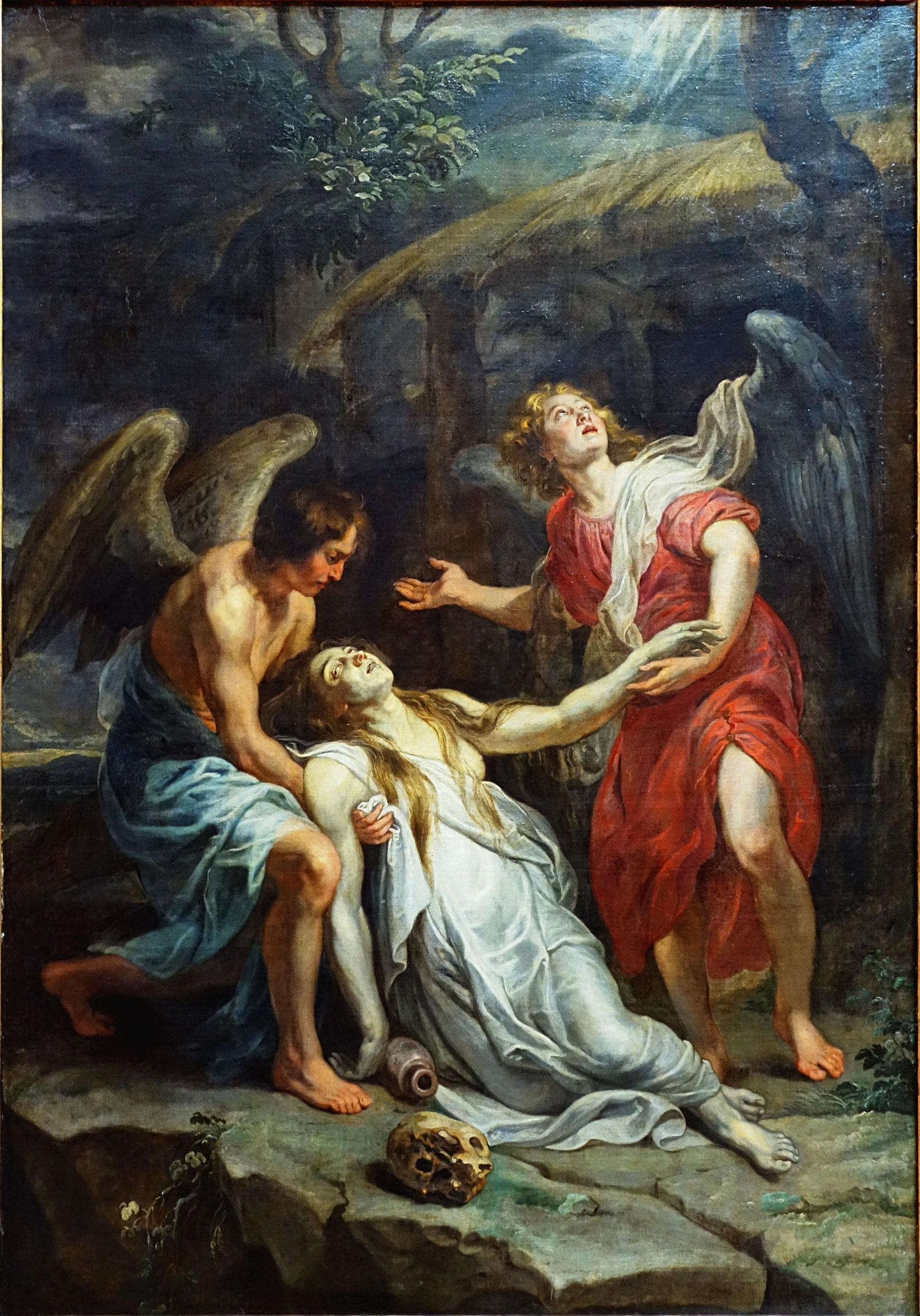
St Mary Magdalene in Ecstasy (c. 1619–1620) by Rubens

St Mary Magdalene in Ecstasy or The Death of St Mary Magdalene is an oil-on-canvas painting by Peter Paul Rubens, completed c. 1619–1620. It shows Mary Magdalene supported by two angels. The painting was produced for the Friars Minor in Ghent. It was seized by French occupation troops in 1794 and taken to Paris, before being allocated to the newly founded Palais des Beaux-Arts de Lille, where it is presently housed.
