= Heinrich Funk =

German painter (1807–1877)

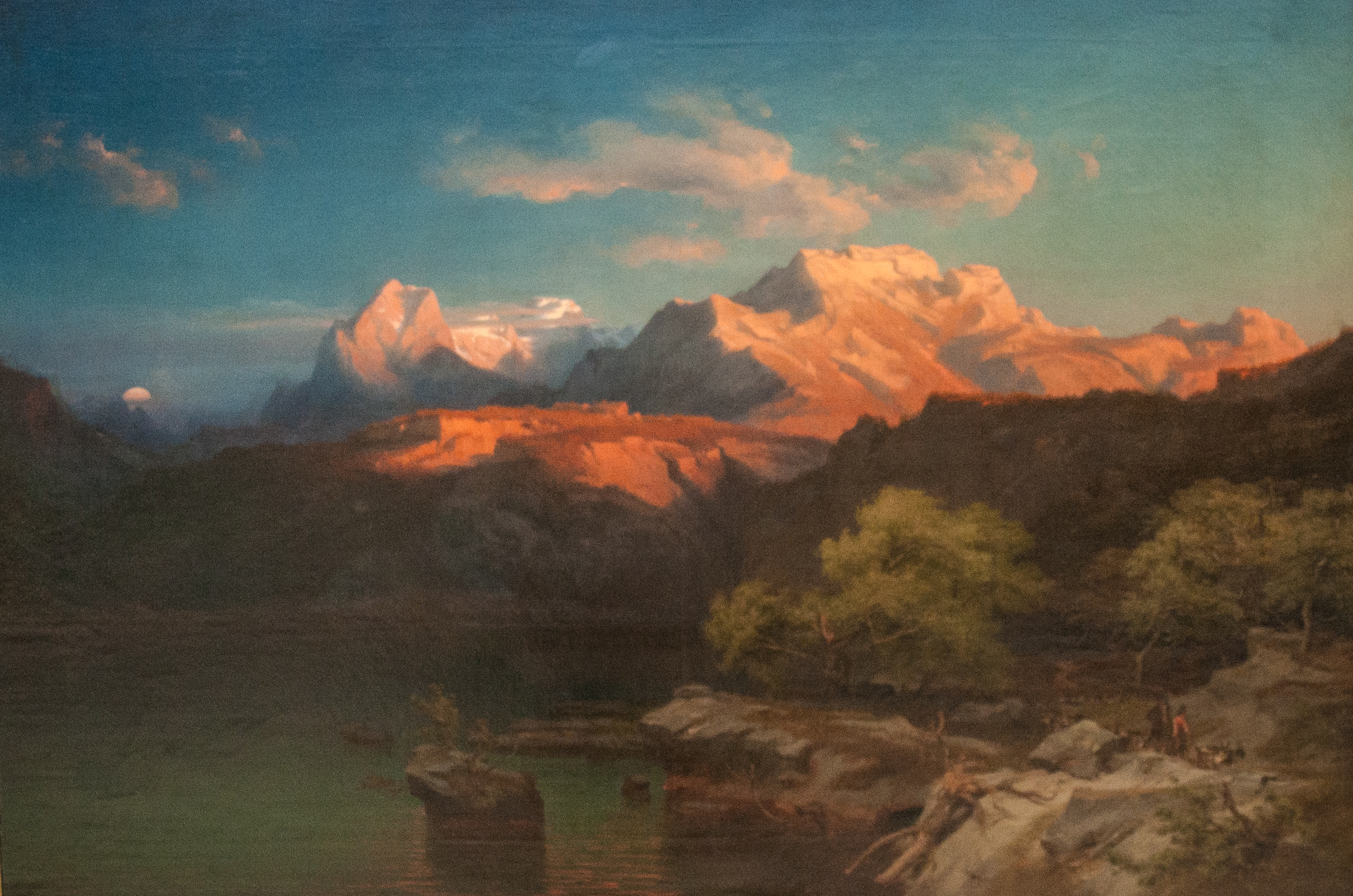
Landscape at Dusk in Tyrol by Heinrich Funk

Heinrich Funk (1807–1877) was a German landscape painter.

== Biography ==
Funk was born in Herford, Westphalia. He was a pupil of Johann Wilhelm Schirmer at the Düsseldorf Academy. In 1836 he settled in Frankfurt am Main, and from 1854 to 1876 was professor at the Royal School of Art in Stuttgart.

== Works ==
Funk was gifted with keen observation, a fine sense of beauty of form and line, and his pictures are notable for perfect drawing, minute execution, and poetic conception, often combined with splendid light effects. As well as his paintings, he also left more than five hundred charcoal and pencil drawings of sterling quality.

Among those in public galleries at the turn of the 20th century were:

- Castle Ruin in the Gloaming (1834), National Gallery, Berlin
- Lower Inn Valley (1846), and Ruin by the Lake(1852), Städel Institute, Frankfort
- The Kaisergebirge in the Inn Valley, and Stormy Weather in the Eifel, Stuttgart Museum
