= List of diplomatic missions of Greece =

This is a list of diplomatic missions of Greece, excluding honorary consulates. Greece has an extensive global diplomatic presence.

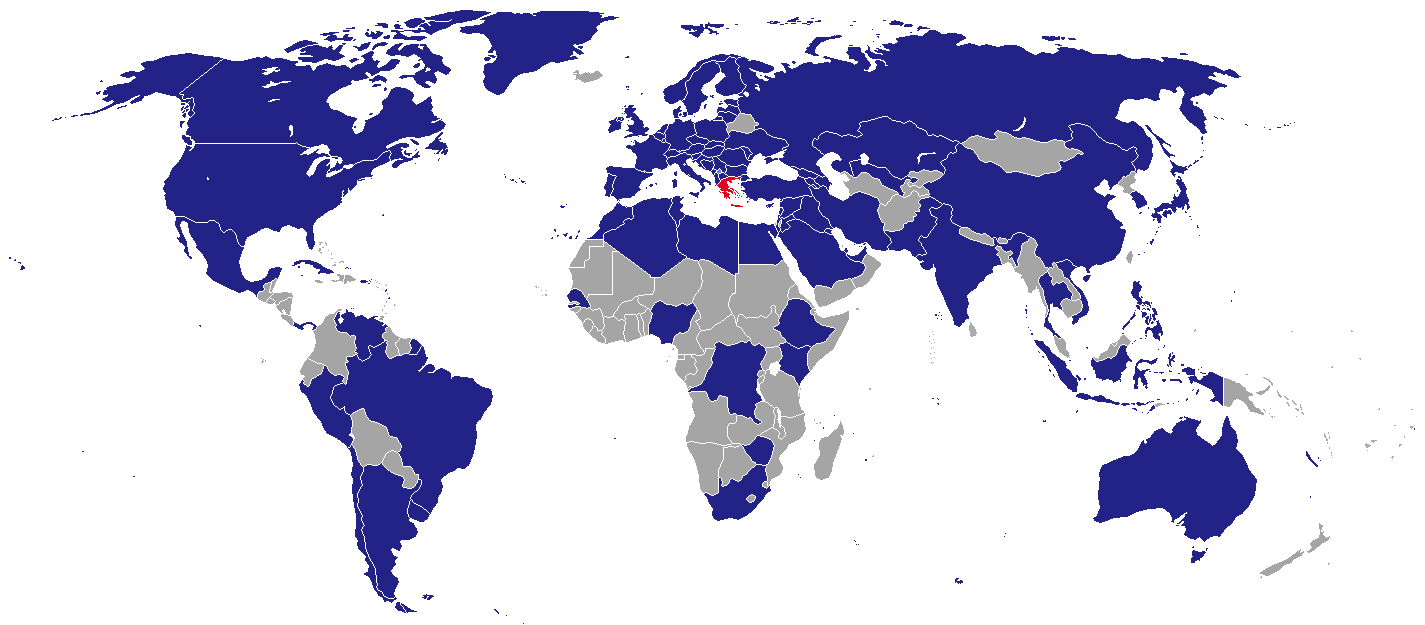
Countries hosting a Greek diplomatic mission (Blue: Embassy, light blue: consulate or de facto embassy only)

== Current missions ==
=== Africa ===
Host country	Host city	Mission	Concurrent accreditation	Ref.
Algeria	Algiers	Embassy		
Congo-Kinshasa	Kinshasa	Embassy	Countries: Angola; Central African Republic; Chad; Congo-Brazzaville; Gabon	
Egypt	Cairo	Embassy	Countries: Eritrea; Sudan	
Egypt	Alexandria	Consulate-General	Countries: Eritrea; Sudan	
Ethiopia	Addis Ababa	Embassy	Countries: Djibouti; South Sudan; International Organizations: African Union (Note: Accredited as an observer mission.)	
Kenya	Nairobi	Embassy	Countries: Burundi; Comoros; Madagascar; Mauritius; Rwanda; Seychelles; Somalia; Tanzania; Uganda; International Organizations: United Nations; United Nations Environment Programme; United Nations Human Settlements Programme	
Libya	Tripoli	Embassy		
Libya	Benghazi	Consulate-General		
Morocco	Rabat	Embassy	Countries: Mauritania	
Nigeria	Abuja	Embassy	Countries: Benin; Burkina Faso; Cameroon; Equatorial Guinea; Ghana; Liberia; Sierra Leone; Togo; International Organizations: Economic Community of West African States	
Senegal	Dakar	Embassy	Countries: Cape Verde; Gambia; Guinea; Guinea-Bissau; Ivory Coast; Mali; Niger	
South Africa	Pretoria	Embassy	Countries: Botswana; Eswatini; Lesotho; Mozambique; Namibia	
South Africa	Johannesburg	Consulate-General	Countries: Botswana; Eswatini; Lesotho; Mozambique; Namibia	
South Africa	Cape Town	Consulate	Countries: Botswana; Eswatini; Lesotho; Mozambique; Namibia	
Tunisia	Tunis	Embassy		
Zimbabwe	Harare	Embassy	Countries: Malawi; Zambia	

=== Americas ===
Host country	Host city	Mission	Concurrent accreditation	Ref.
Argentina	Buenos Aires	Embassy	Countries: Bolivia	
Brazil	Brasília	Embassy	Countries: Suriname	
Brazil	São Paulo	Consulate-General	Countries: Suriname	
Canada	Ottawa	Embassy		
Canada	Montreal	Consulate-General		
Canada	Toronto	Consulate-General		
Canada	Vancouver	Consulate-General		
Chile	Santiago de Chile	Embassy		
Cuba	Havana	Embassy	Countries: Antigua and Barbuda; Dominica; Dominican Republic; Guyana; Haiti; Saint Kitts and Nevis	
Mexico	Mexico City	Embassy	Countries: Belize; El Salvador; Guatemala; Honduras; Nicaragua	
Panama	Panama City	Embassy	Countries: Barbados; Costa Rica; Jamaica; Saint Lucia; Saint Vincent and the Grenadines; Trinidad and Tobago	
Peru	Lima	Embassy	Countries: Colombia; Ecuador	
United States	Washington, D.C.	Embassy	Countries: Bahamas; International Organizations: Organization of American States	
United States	Boston	Consulate-General	Countries: Bahamas; International Organizations: Organization of American States	
United States	Chicago	Consulate-General	Countries: Bahamas; International Organizations: Organization of American States	
United States	Los Angeles	Consulate-General	Countries: Bahamas; International Organizations: Organization of American States	
United States	New York City	Consulate-General	Countries: Bahamas; International Organizations: Organization of American States	
United States	San Francisco	Consulate-General	Countries: Bahamas; International Organizations: Organization of American States	
United States	Tampa	Consulate-General	Countries: Bahamas; International Organizations: Organization of American States	
United States	Atlanta	Consulate	Countries: Bahamas; International Organizations: Organization of American States	
United States	Houston	Consulate	Countries: Bahamas; International Organizations: Organization of American States	
Uruguay	Montevideo	Embassy	Countries: Paraguay	
Venezuela	Caracas	Embassy		

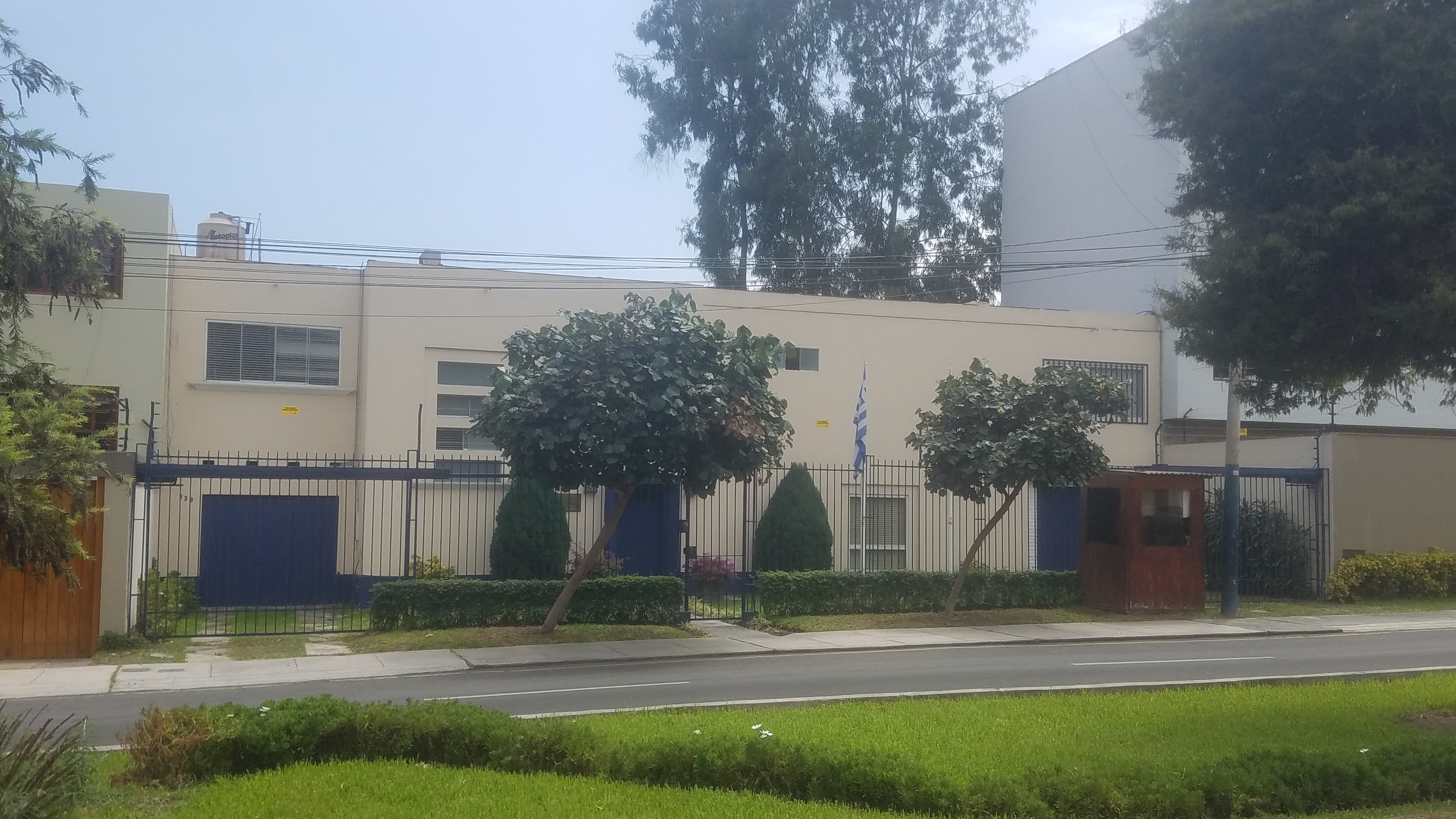
Embassy in Lima

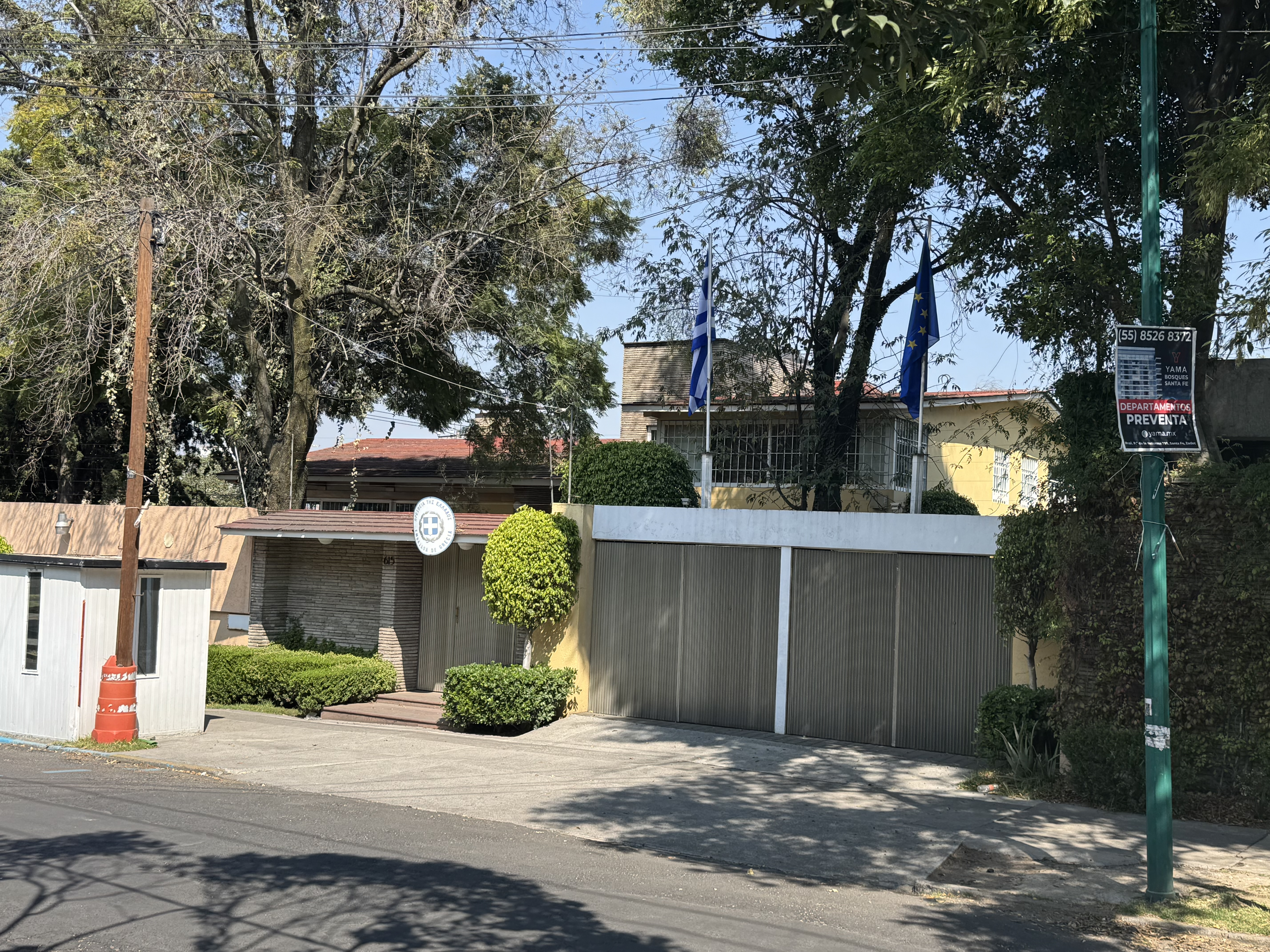
Embassy in Mexico City

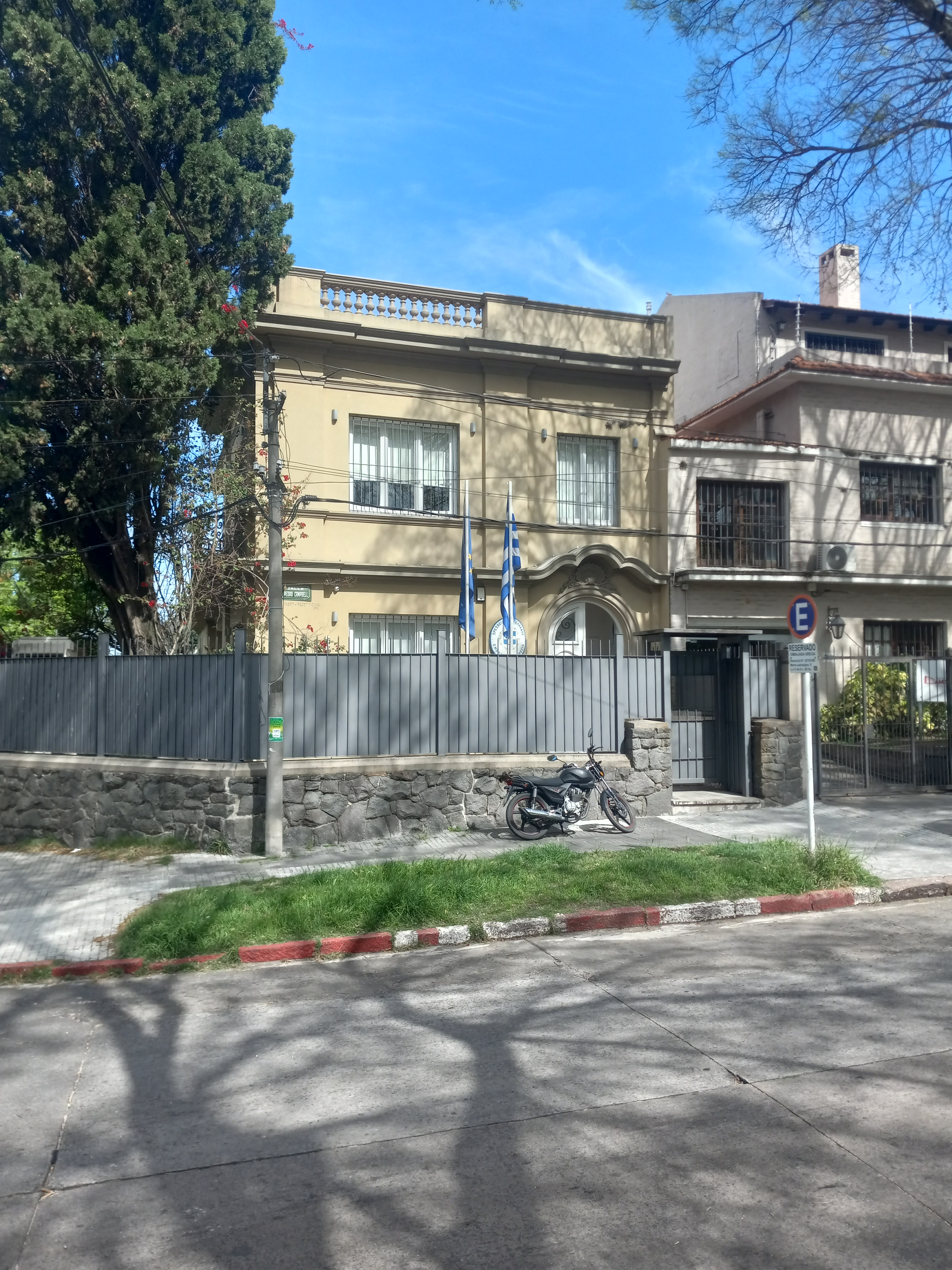
Embassy in Montevideo

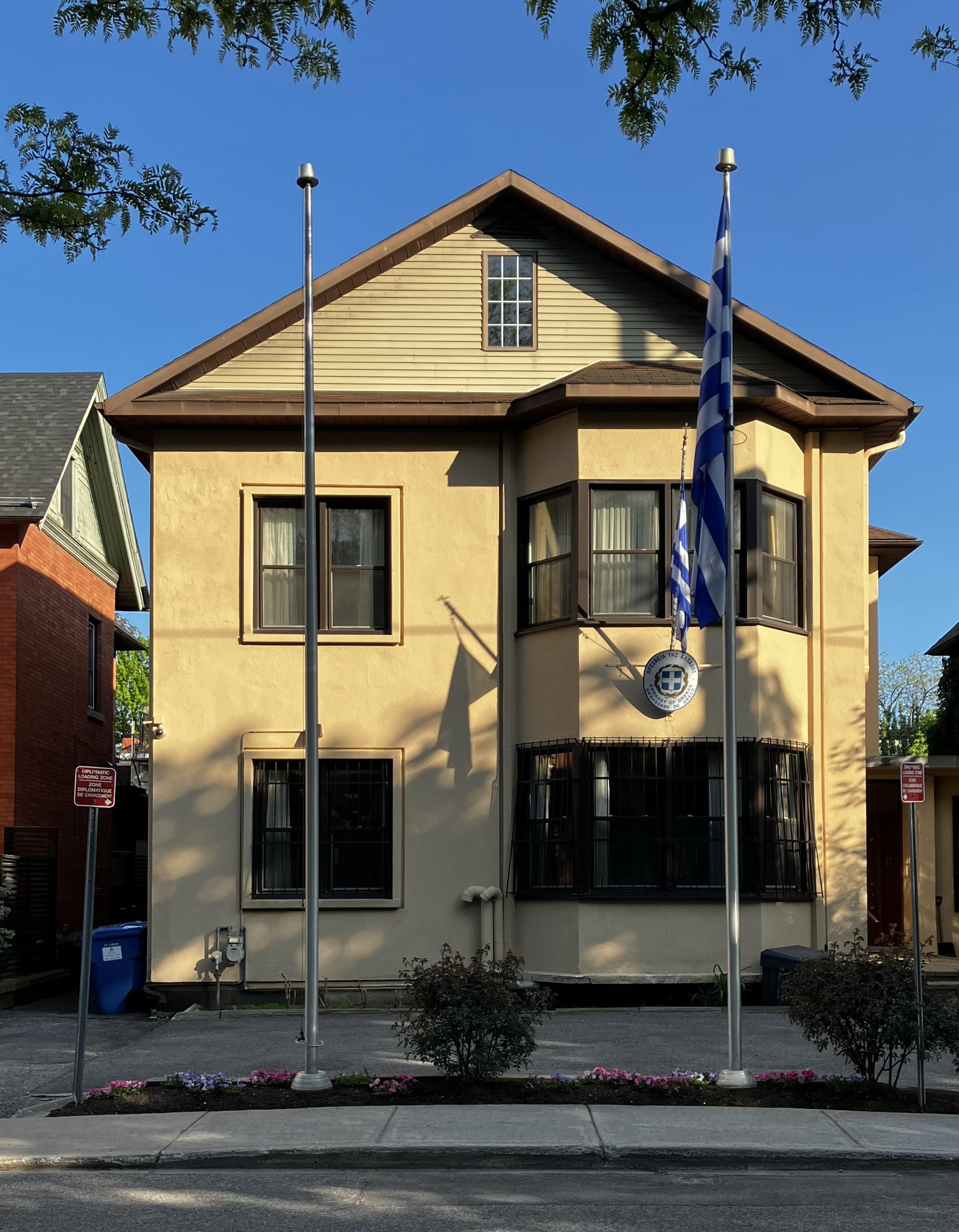
Embassy in Ottawa

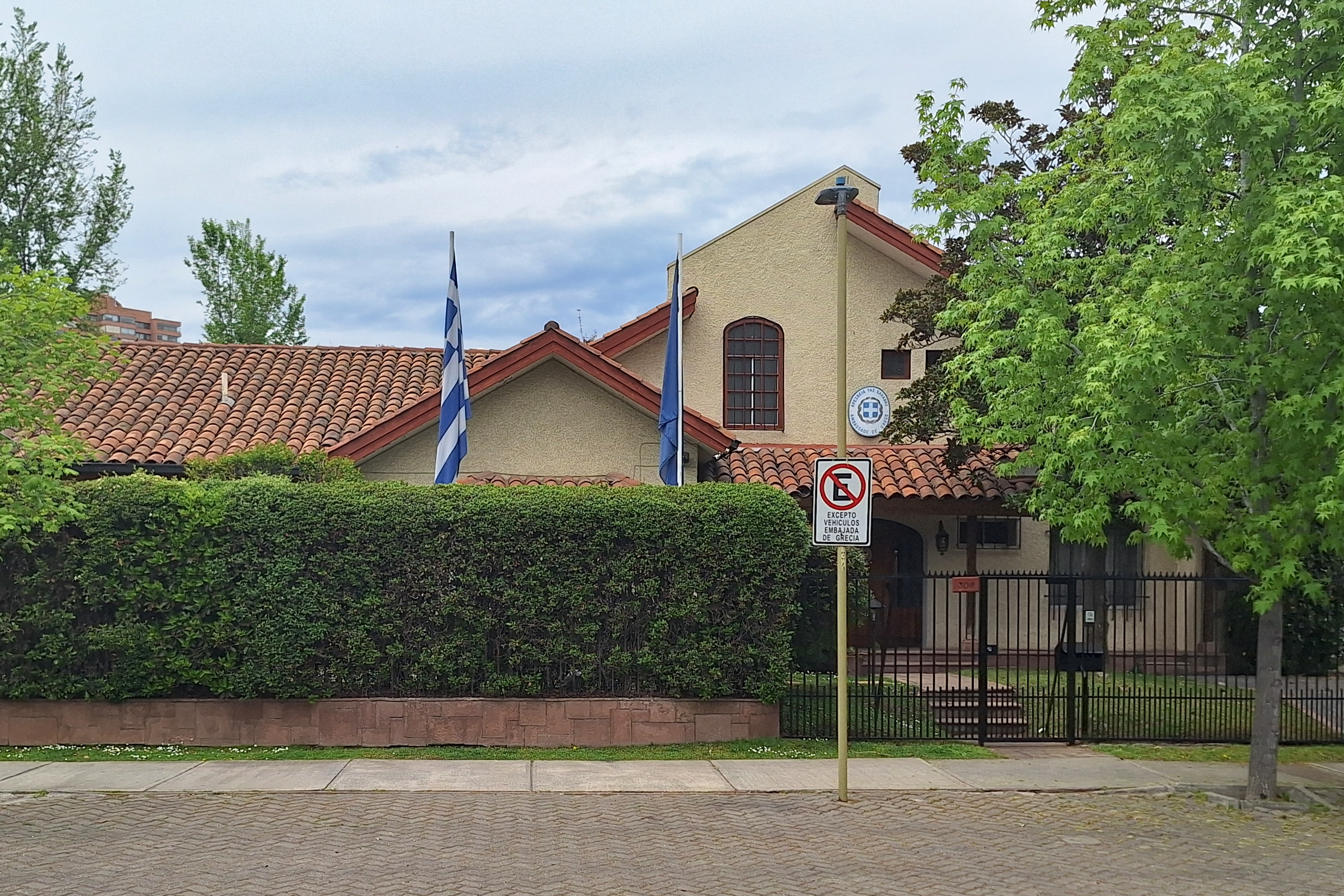
Embassy in Santiago de Chile

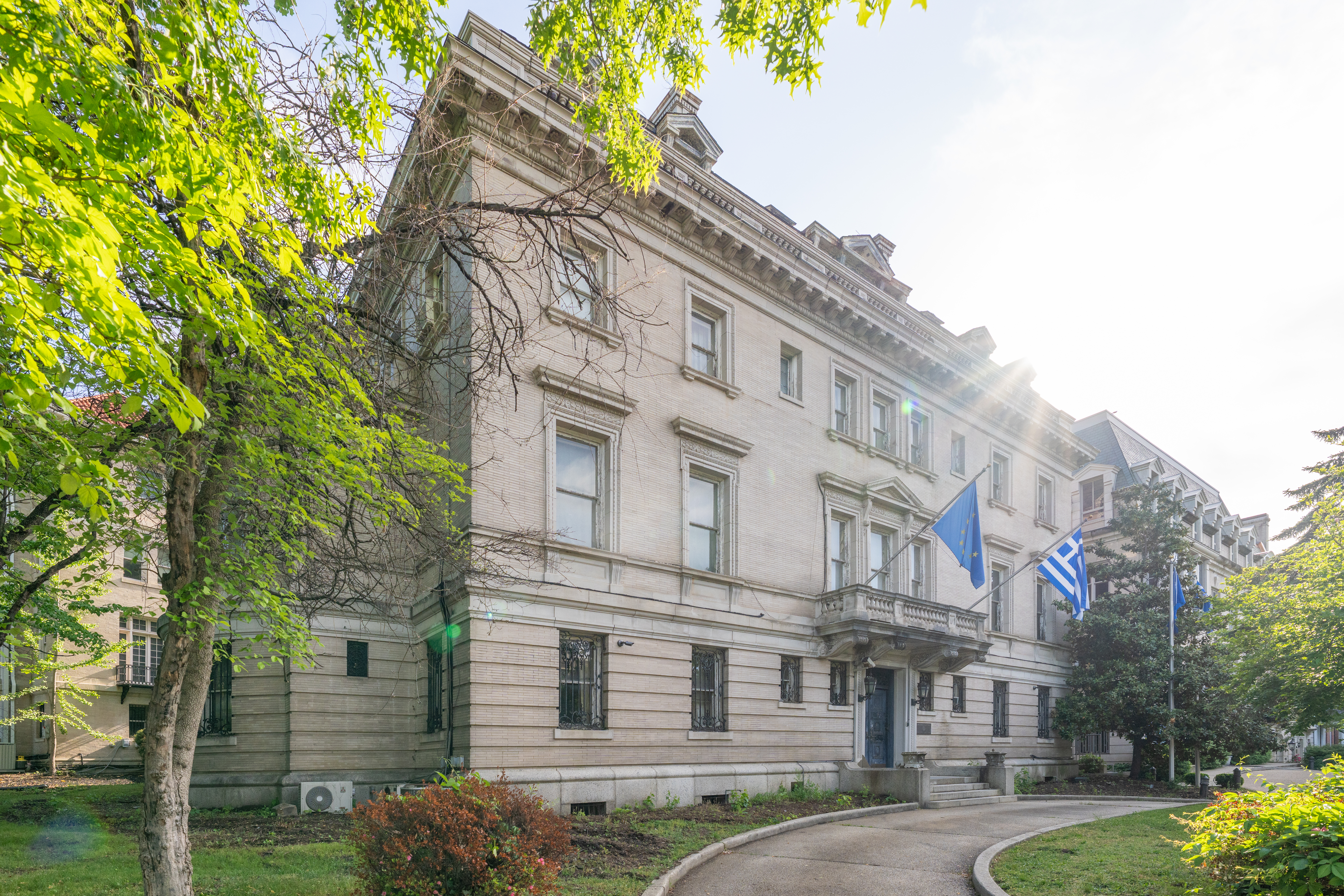
Embassy in Washington, D.C.

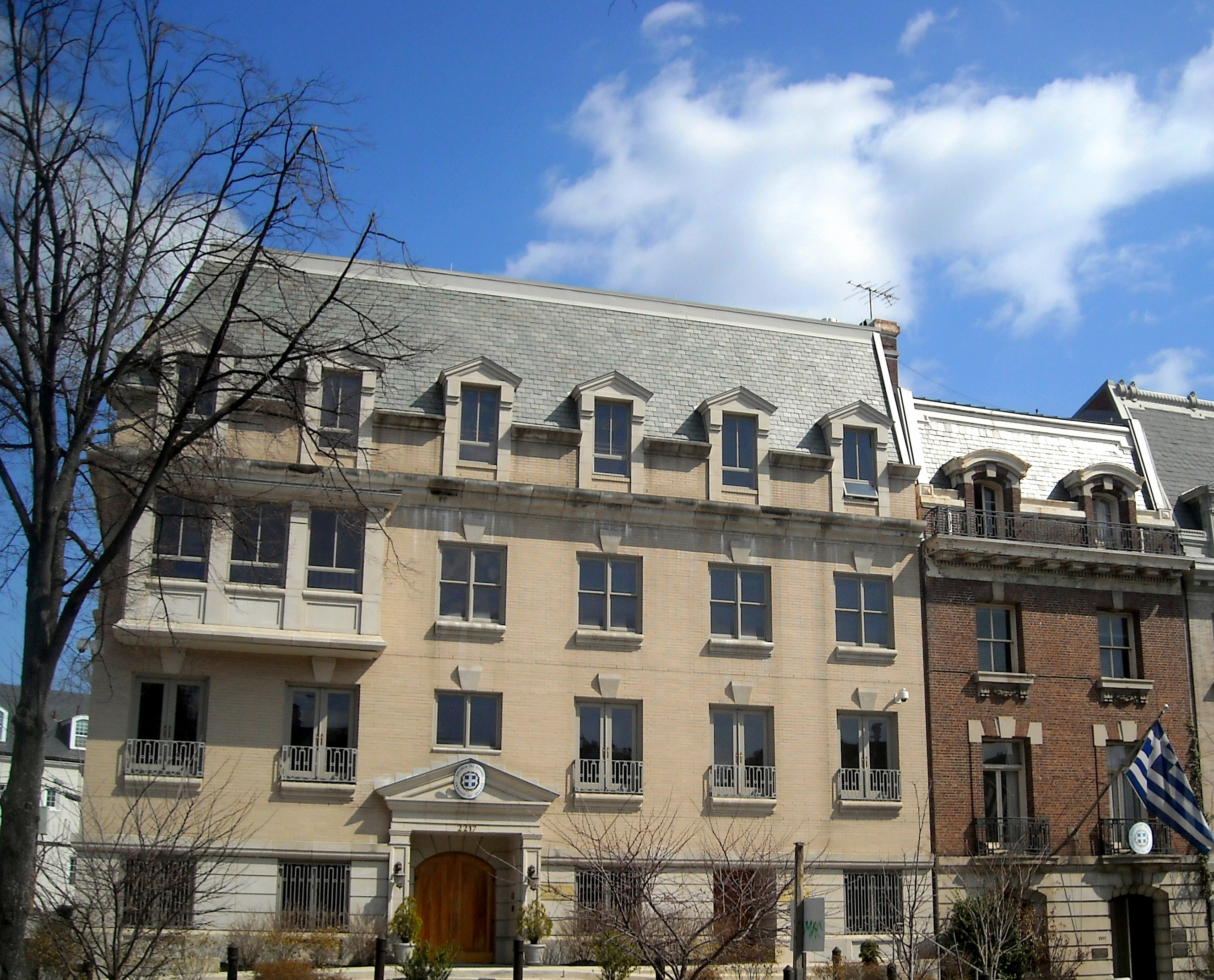
Consular Section in Washington, D.C.

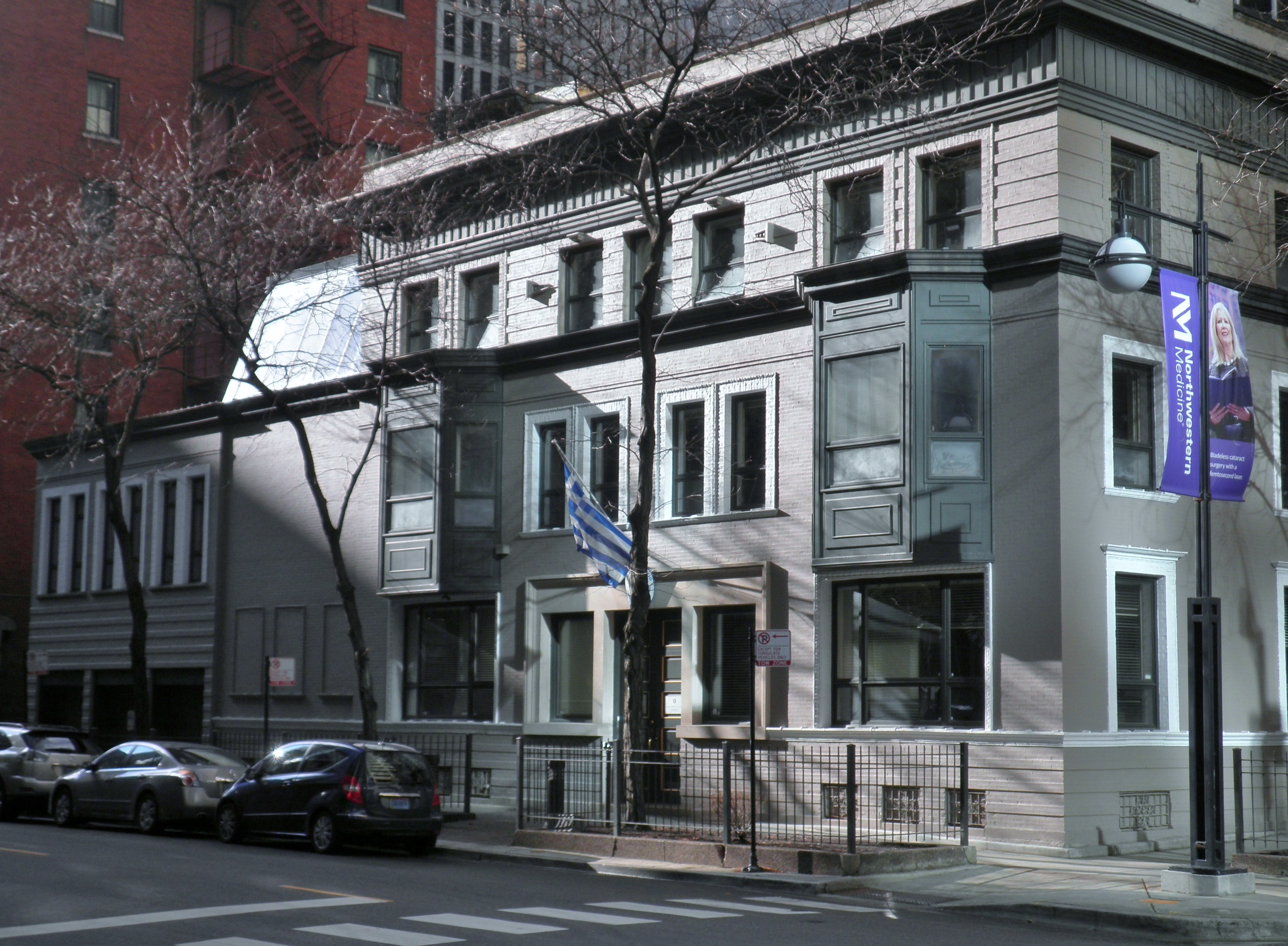
Consulate-General in Chicago

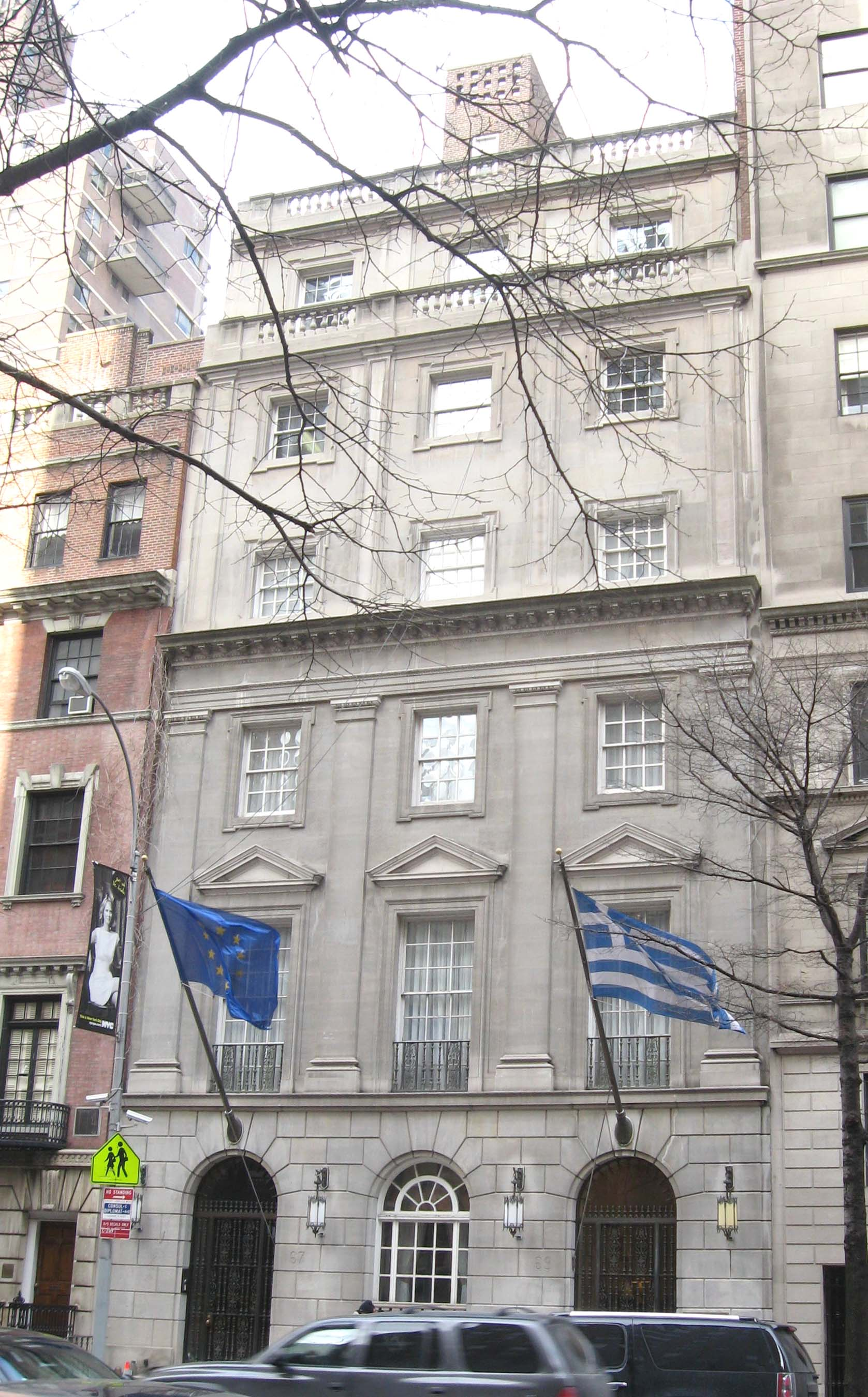
Consulate-General in New York City

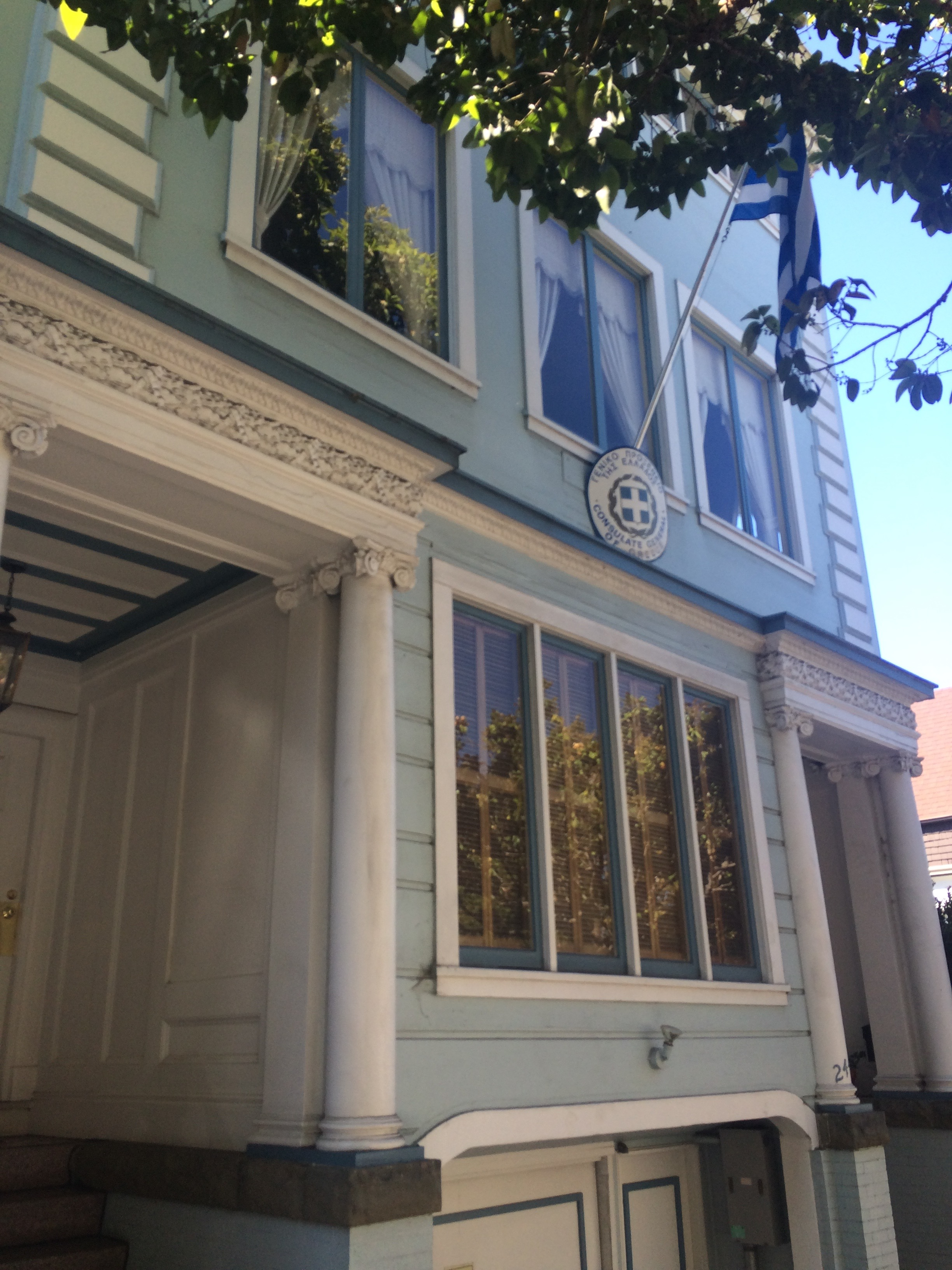
Consulate-General in San Francisco

=== Asia ===
Host country	Host city	Mission	Concurrent accreditation	Ref.
Armenia	Yerevan	Embassy		
Azerbaijan	Baku	Embassy		
China	Beijing	Embassy	Countries: Mongolia	
China	Guangzhou	Consulate-General	Countries: Mongolia	
China	Hong Kong	Consulate-General	Countries: Mongolia	
China	Shanghai	Consulate-General	Countries: Mongolia	
Georgia	Tbilisi	Embassy		
India	New Delhi	Embassy	Countries: Bangladesh; Maldives; Nepal; Sri Lanka	
Indonesia	Jakarta	Embassy	Countries: Malaysia; International Organizations: Association of Southeast Asian Nations	
Iran	Tehran	Embassy		
Iraq	Baghdad	Embassy		
Iraq	Erbil	Consulate-General		
Israel	Tel Aviv	Embassy		
Israel	Jerusalem	Consulate-General		
Japan	Tokyo	Embassy	Countries: Marshall Islands; Micronesia; Tuvalu	
Jordan	Amman	Embassy		
Kazakhstan	Astana	Embassy	Countries: Kyrgyzstan	
Kuwait	Kuwait City	Embassy	Countries: Bahrain	
Lebanon	Beirut	Embassy		
Pakistan	Islamabad	Embassy	Countries: Afghanistan	
Philippines	Manila	Embassy	Countries: Palau	
Qatar	Doha	Embassy		
Saudi Arabia	Riyadh	Embassy	Countries: Oman; Yemen	
Saudi Arabia	Jeddah	Consulate-General	Countries: Oman; Yemen	
Singapore	Singapore	Embassy	Countries: Brunei; Timor-Leste	
South Korea	Seoul	Embassy	Countries: North Korea	
Syria	Damascus	Embassy		
Thailand	Bangkok	Embassy	Countries: Cambodia; Myanmar	
Turkey	Ankara	Embassy		
Turkey	Istanbul	Consulate-General		
Turkey	İzmir	Consulate-General		
Turkey	Edirne	Consulate		
United Arab Emirates	Abu Dhabi	Embassy		
Uzbekistan	Tashkent	Embassy		
Vietnam	Hanoi	Embassy	Countries: Laos	

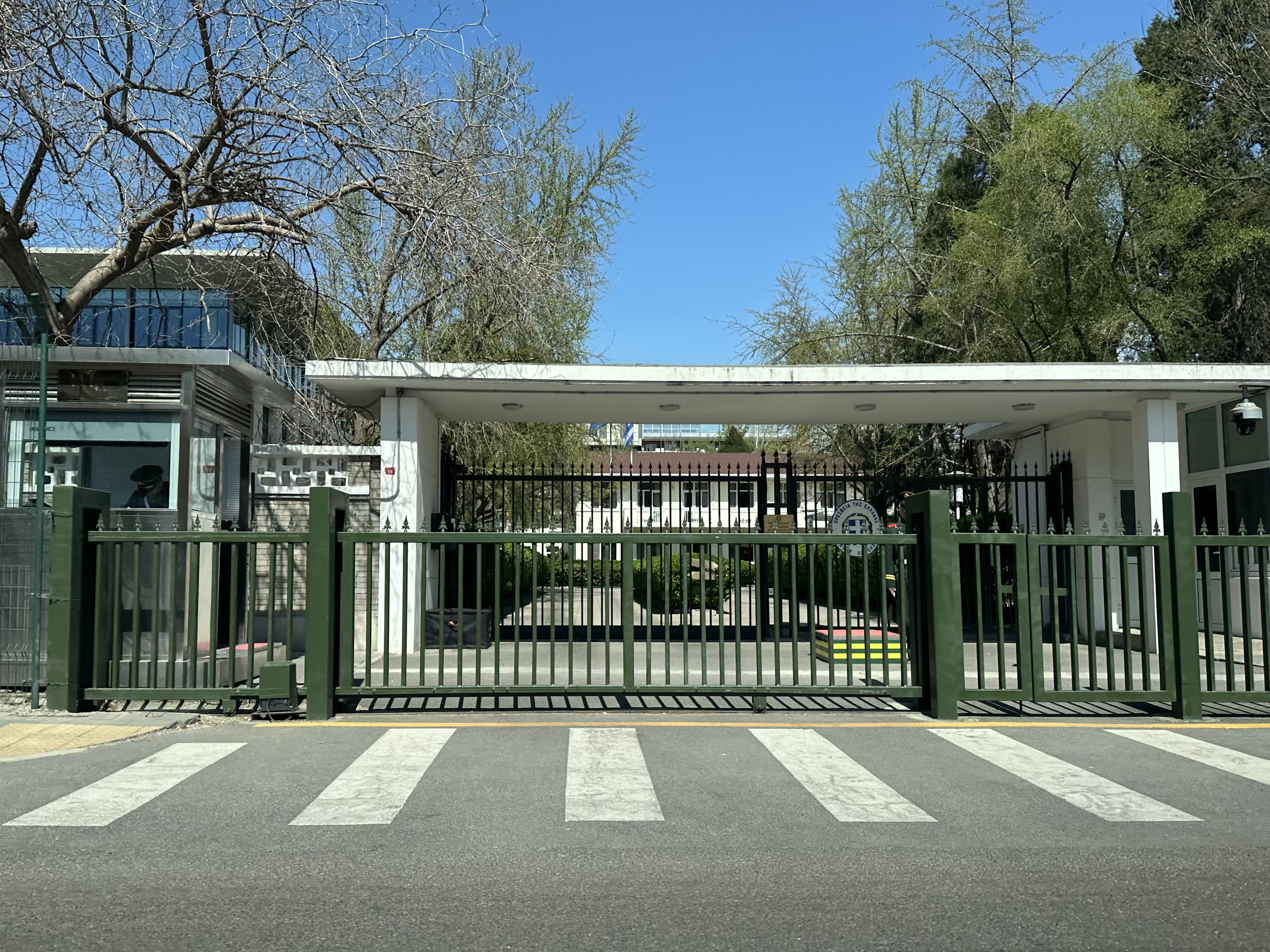
Embassy in Beijing

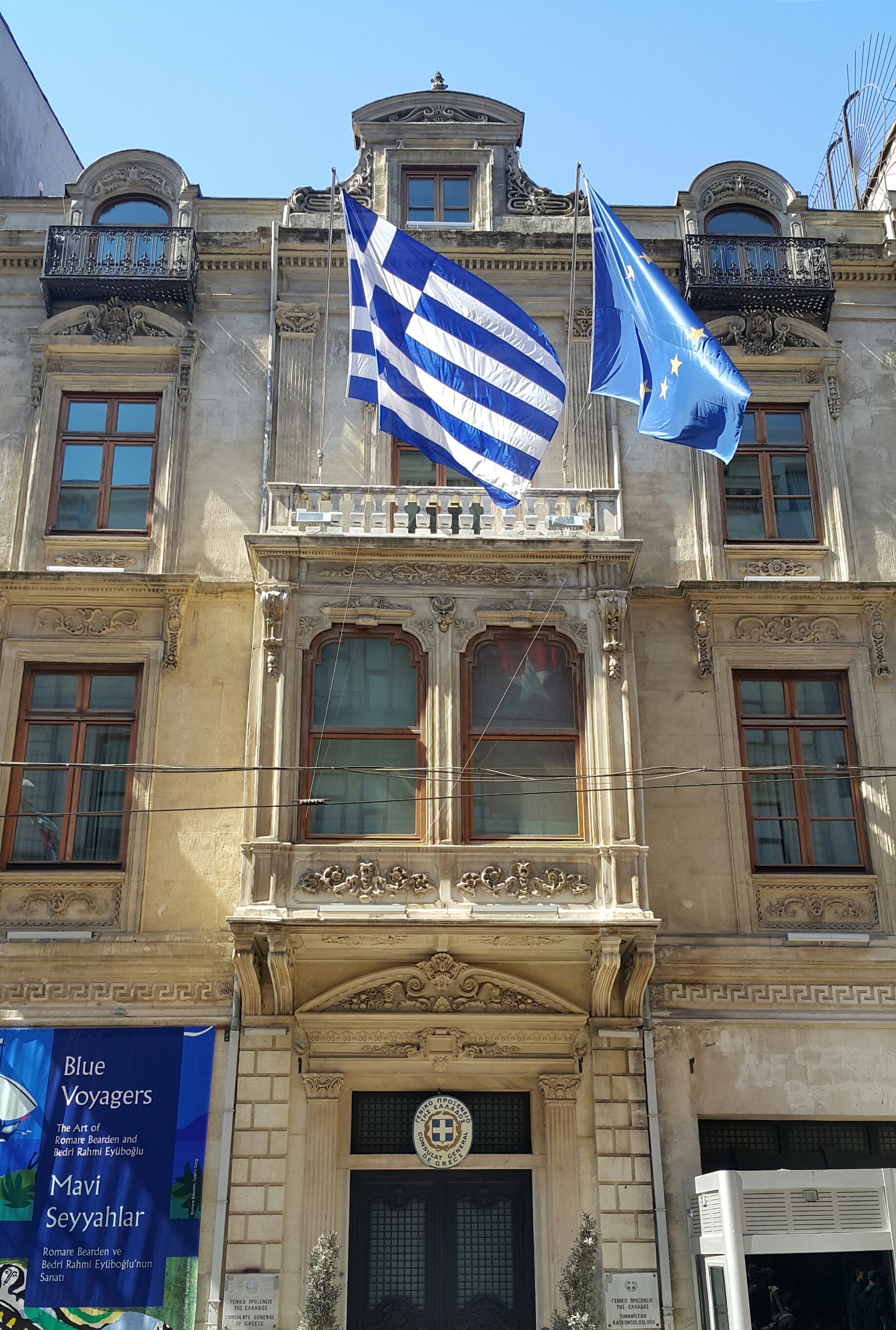
Consulate-General in Istanbul

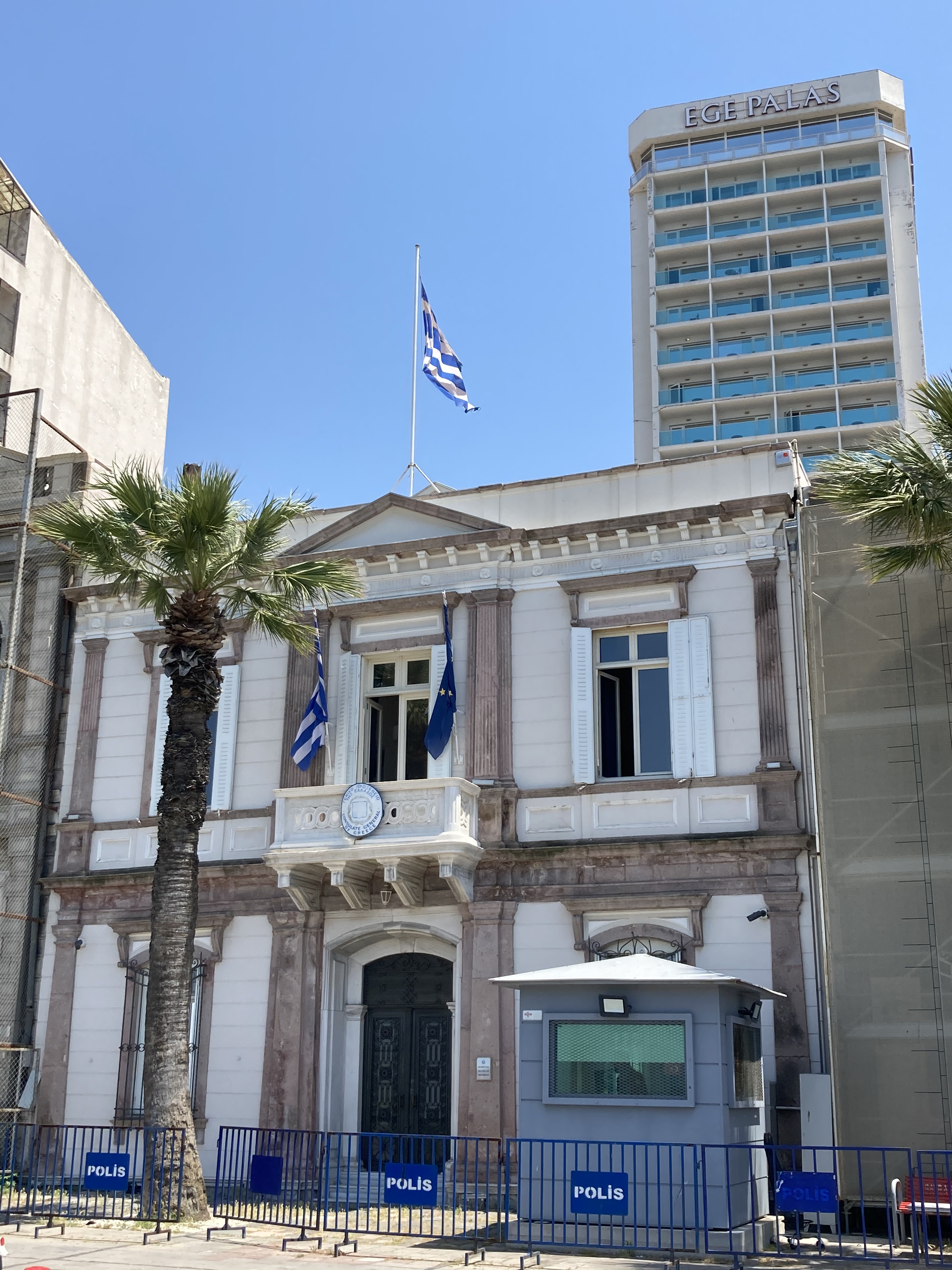
Consulate-General in Izmir

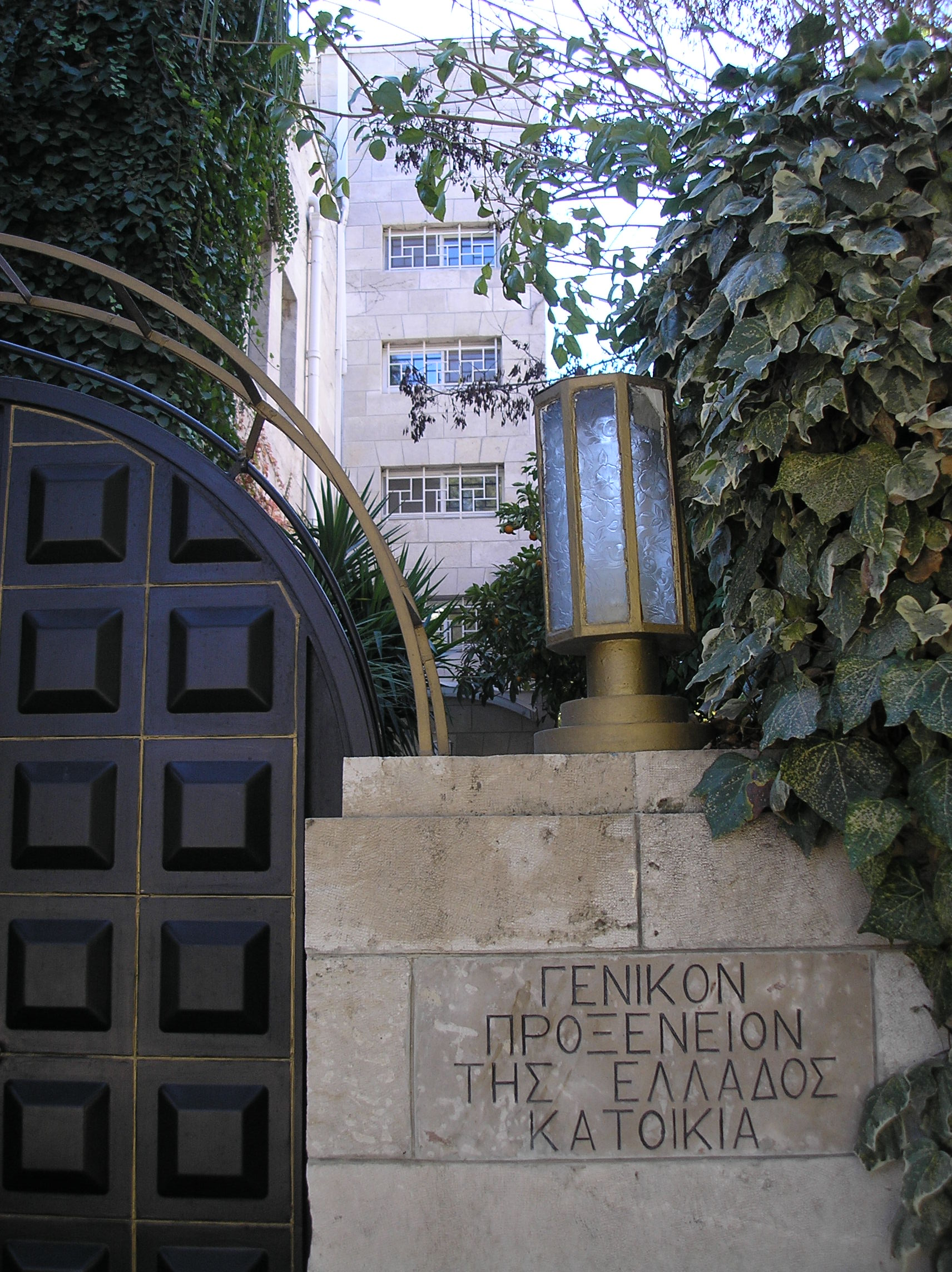
Consulate-General in Jerusalem

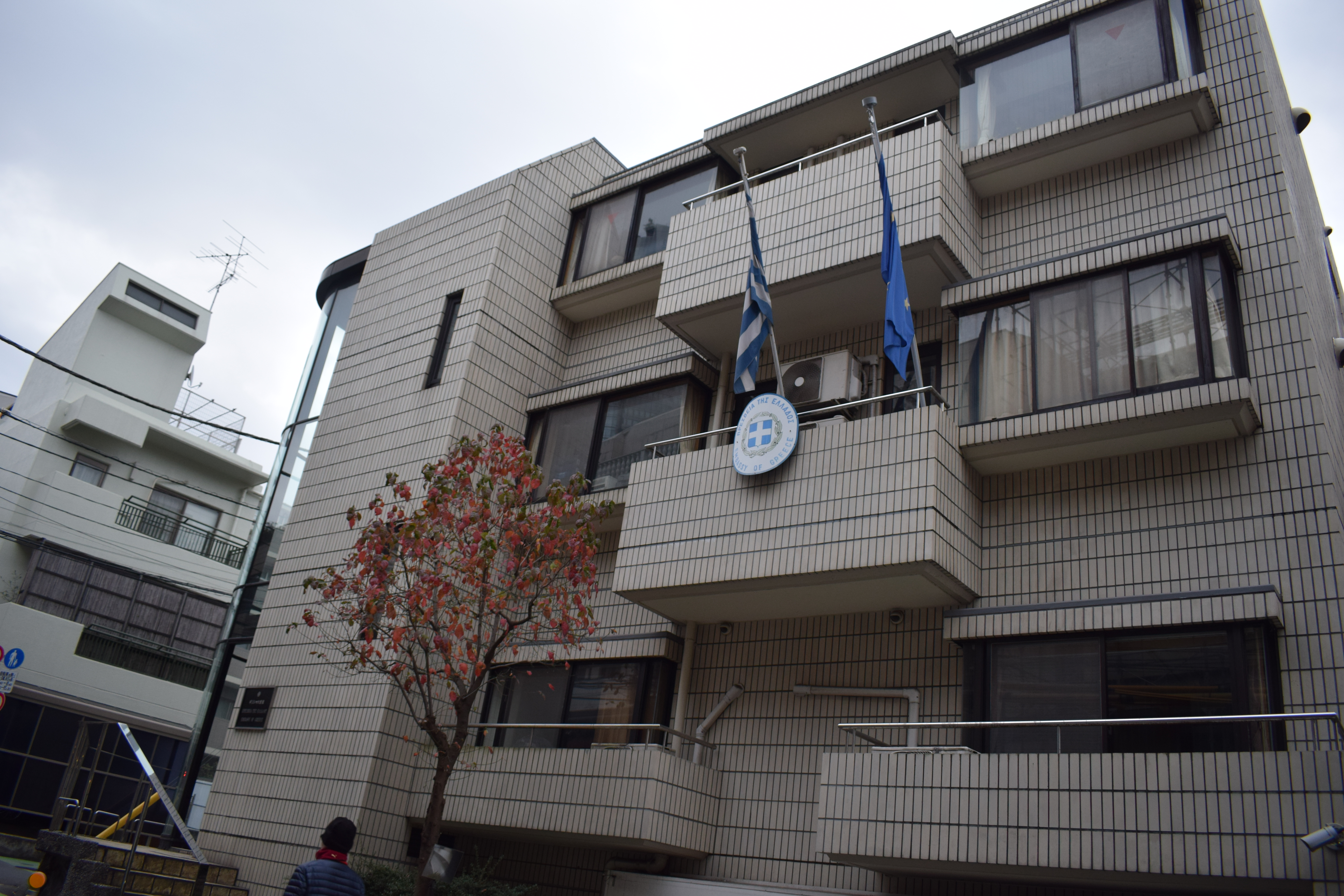
Embassy in Tokyo

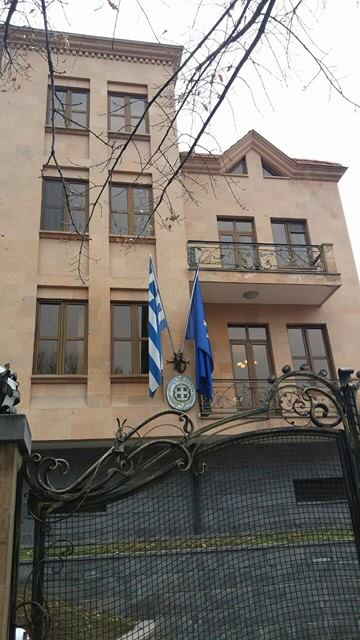
Embassy in Yerevan

=== Europe ===
Host country	Host city	Mission	Concurrent accreditation	Ref.
Albania	Tirana	Embassy		
Albania	Gjirokastër	Consulate-General		
Albania	Korçë	Consulate-General		
Austria	Vienna	Embassy	International Organizations: United Nations; International Atomic Energy Agency; UNIDO; UNODC; UNCITRAL	
Bosnia and Herzegovina	Sarajevo	Embassy		
Belgium	Brussels	Embassy		
Bulgaria	Sofia	Embassy		
Croatia	Zagreb	Embassy		
Cyprus	Nicosia	Embassy		
Czech Republic	Prague	Embassy		
Denmark	Copenhagen	Embassy		
Estonia	Tallinn	Embassy		
Finland	Helsinki	Embassy		
France	Paris	Embassy	Countries: Monaco	
Germany	Berlin	Embassy		
Germany	Düsseldorf	Consulate-General		
Germany	Frankfurt	Consulate-General		
Germany	Hamburg	Consulate-General		
Germany	Munich	Consulate-General		
Germany	Stuttgart	Consulate-General		
Holy See (Note: The Greek Embassy to the Holy See is located outside Vatican territory, in Rome.)	Rome	Embassy	Sovereign Entity: Sovereign Military Order of Malta	
Hungary	Budapest	Embassy		
Ireland	Dublin	Embassy		
Italy	Rome	Embassy	Countries: San Marino; International Organizations: Food and Agriculture Organization; International Fund for Agricultural Development; World Food Programme	
Kosovo (Note: Greece does not recognize Kosovo's declaration of independence, and therefore does not maintain formal diplomatic relations with it. Nonetheless, it maintains a liaison office in Pristina, which functions as a de facto embassy, and is headed by a diplomat of ambassadorial rank.)	Pristina	Liaison office		
Latvia	Riga	Embassy		
Lithuania	Vilnius	Embassy		
Luxembourg	Luxembourg City	Embassy		
Malta	Valletta	Embassy		
Moldova	Chişinău	Embassy		
Montenegro	Podgorica	Embassy		
Netherlands	The Hague	Embassy	International Organizations: OPCW	
North Macedonia	Skopje	Embassy		
North Macedonia	Bitola	Consulate-General		
Norway	Oslo	Embassy	Countries: Iceland	
Poland	Warsaw	Embassy		
Portugal	Lisbon	Embassy	Countries: São Tomé and Príncipe	
Romania	Bucharest	Embassy		
Russia	Moscow	Embassy	Countries: Belarus; Tajikistan; Turkmenistan	
Russia	Novorossiysk	Consulate-General	Countries: Belarus; Tajikistan; Turkmenistan	
Russia	Saint Petersburg	Consulate-General	Countries: Belarus; Tajikistan; Turkmenistan	
Serbia	Belgrade	Embassy		
Slovakia	Bratislava	Embassy		
Slovenia	Ljubljana	Embassy		
Spain	Madrid	Embassy	Countries: Andorra	
Sweden	Stockholm	Embassy		
Switzerland	Bern	Embassy	Countries: Liechtenstein	
Switzerland	Geneva	Consulate-General	Countries: Liechtenstein	
Ukraine	Kyiv	Embassy		
Ukraine	Odesa	Consulate-General		
United Kingdom	London	Embassy		
United Kingdom	Manchester	Consulate-General		

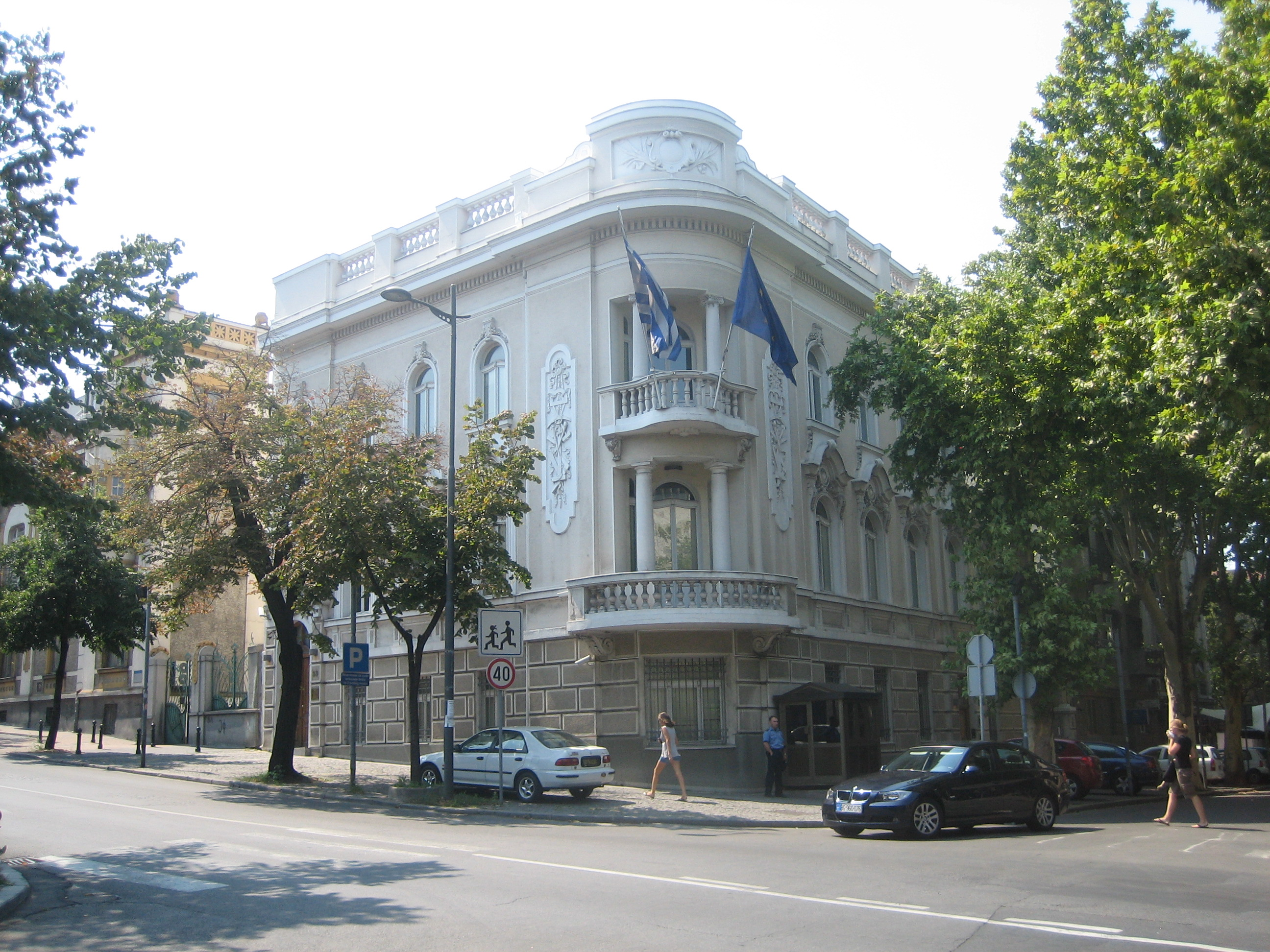
Embassy in Belgrade

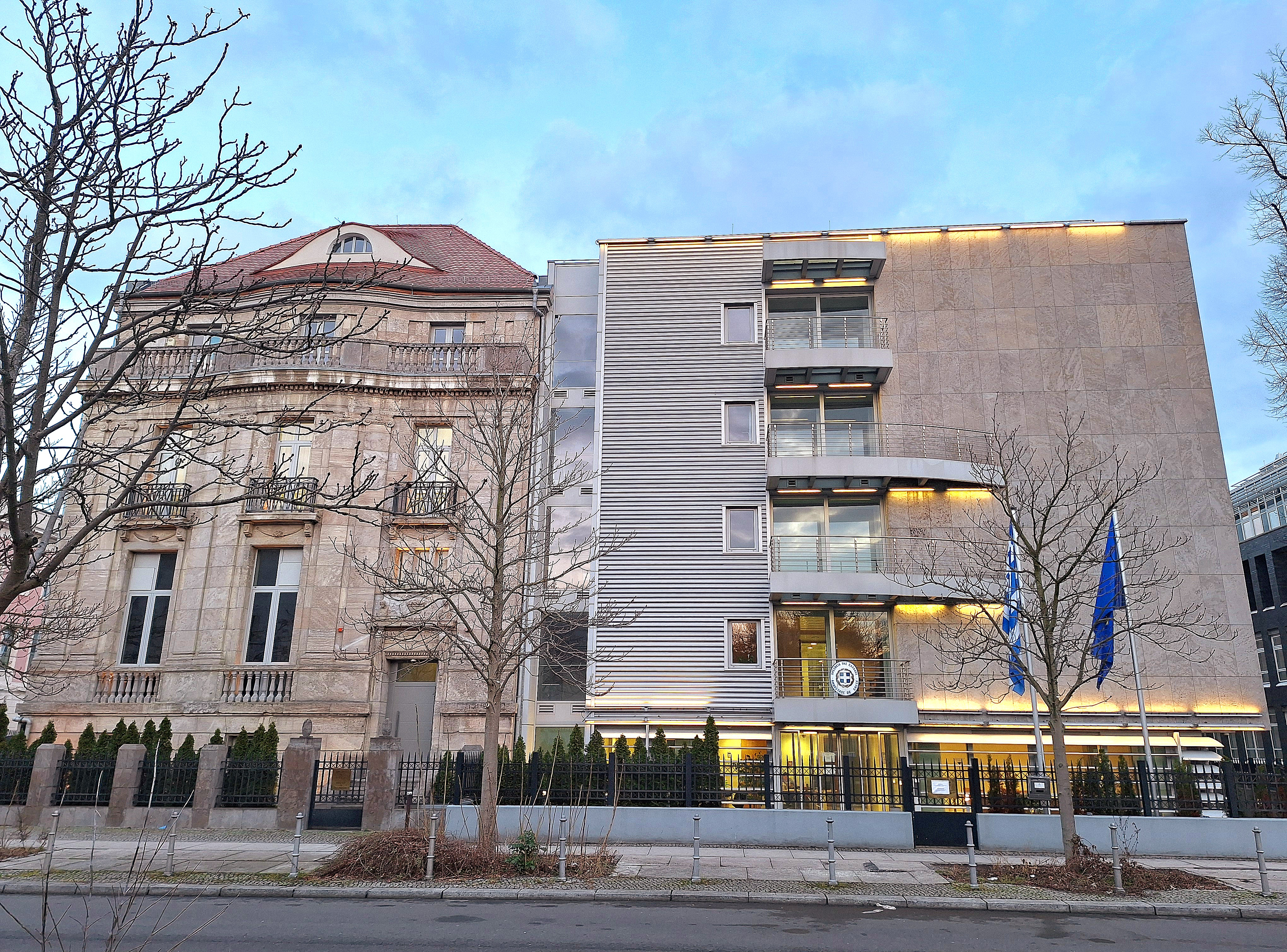
Embassy in Berlin

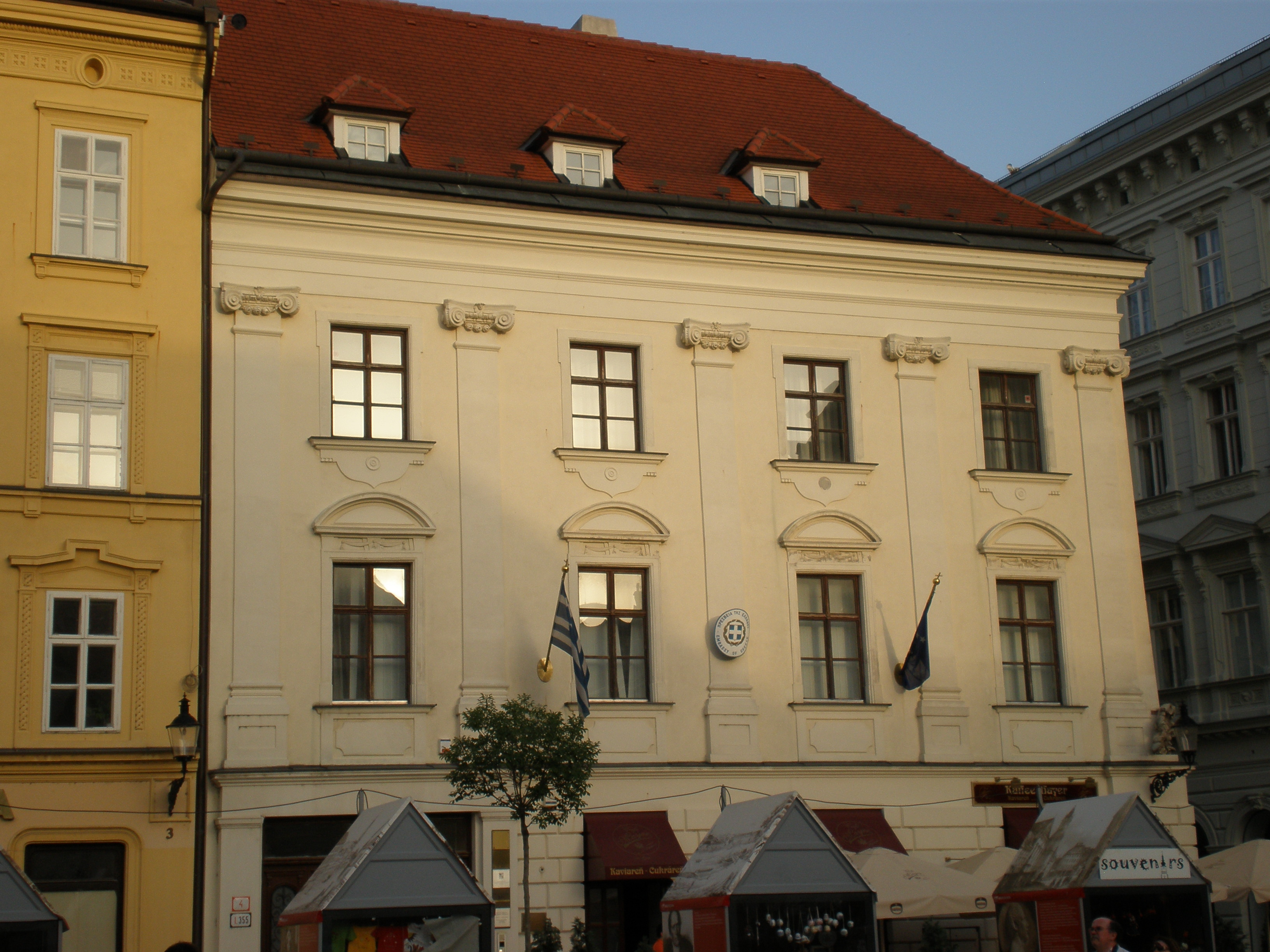
Embassy in Bratislava

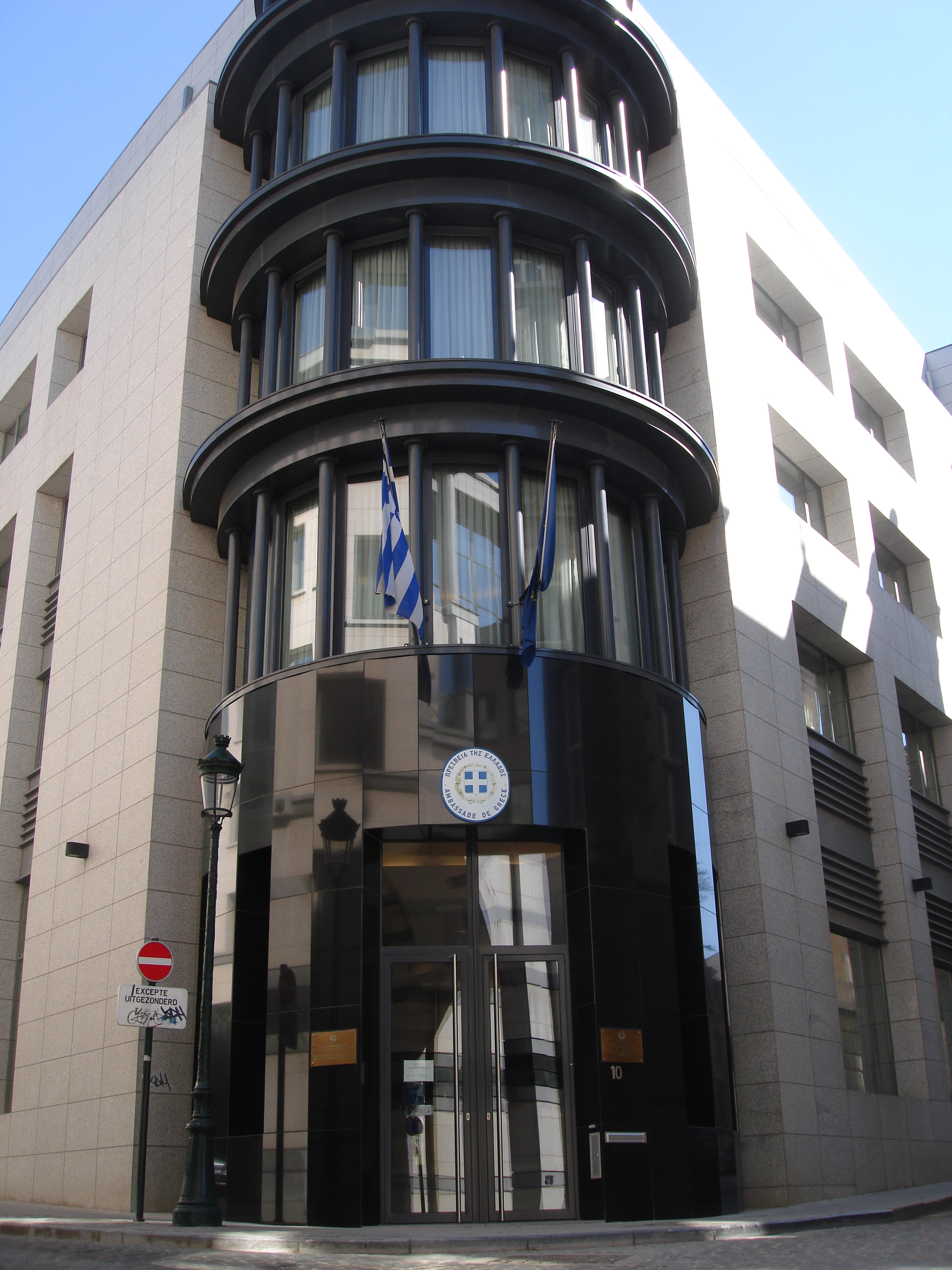
Embassy in Brussels

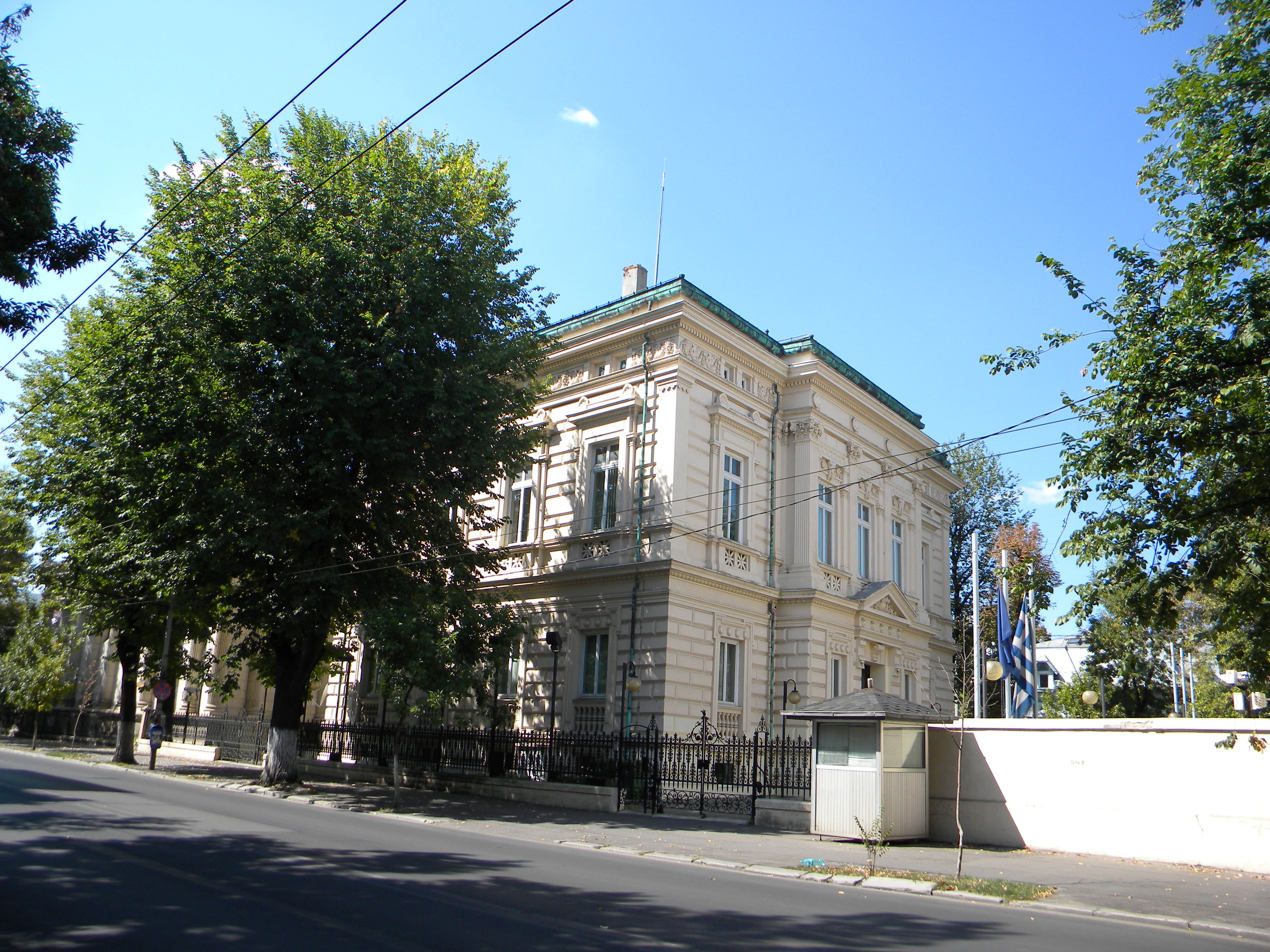
Embassy in Bucharest

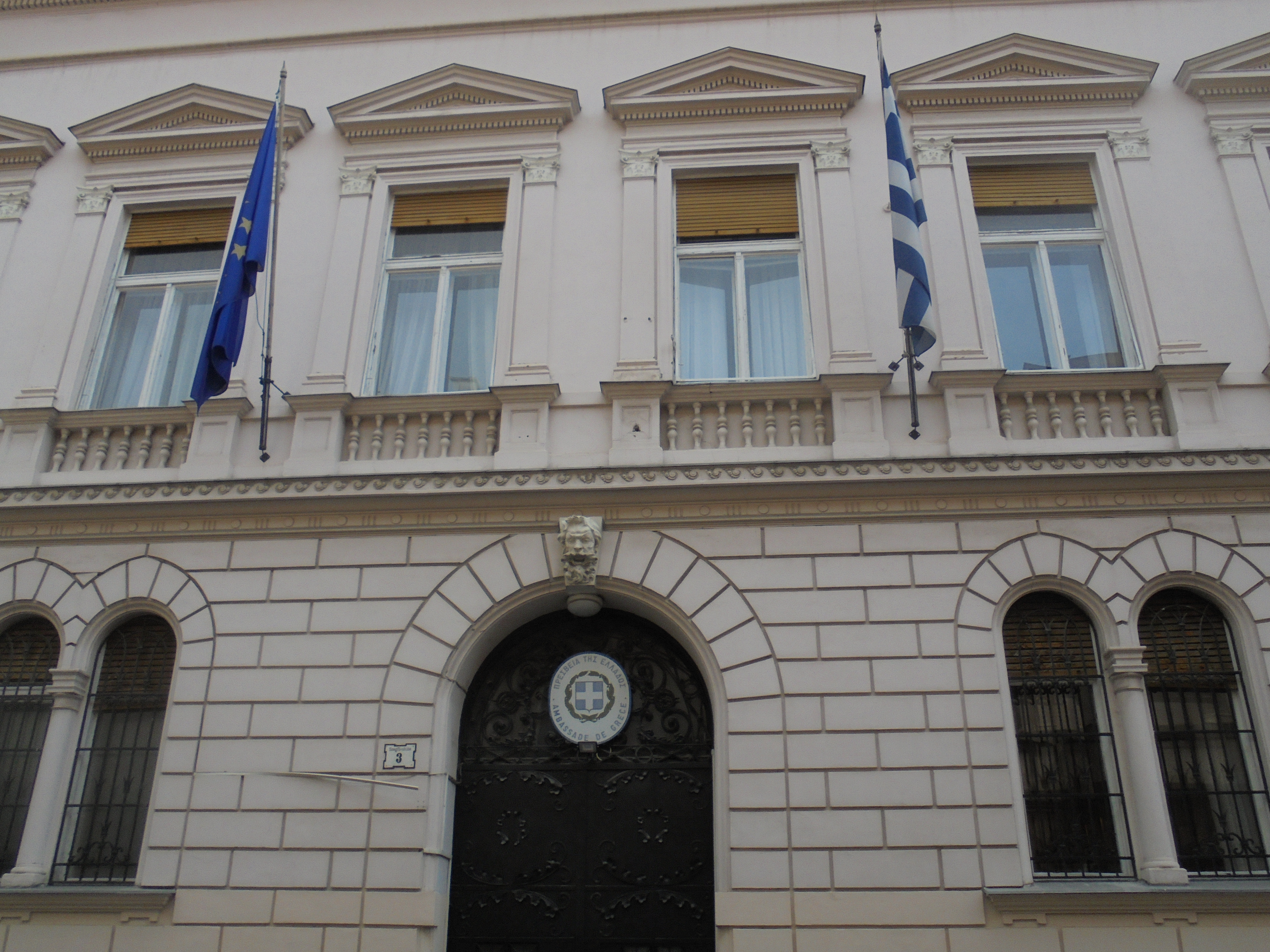
Embassy in Budapest

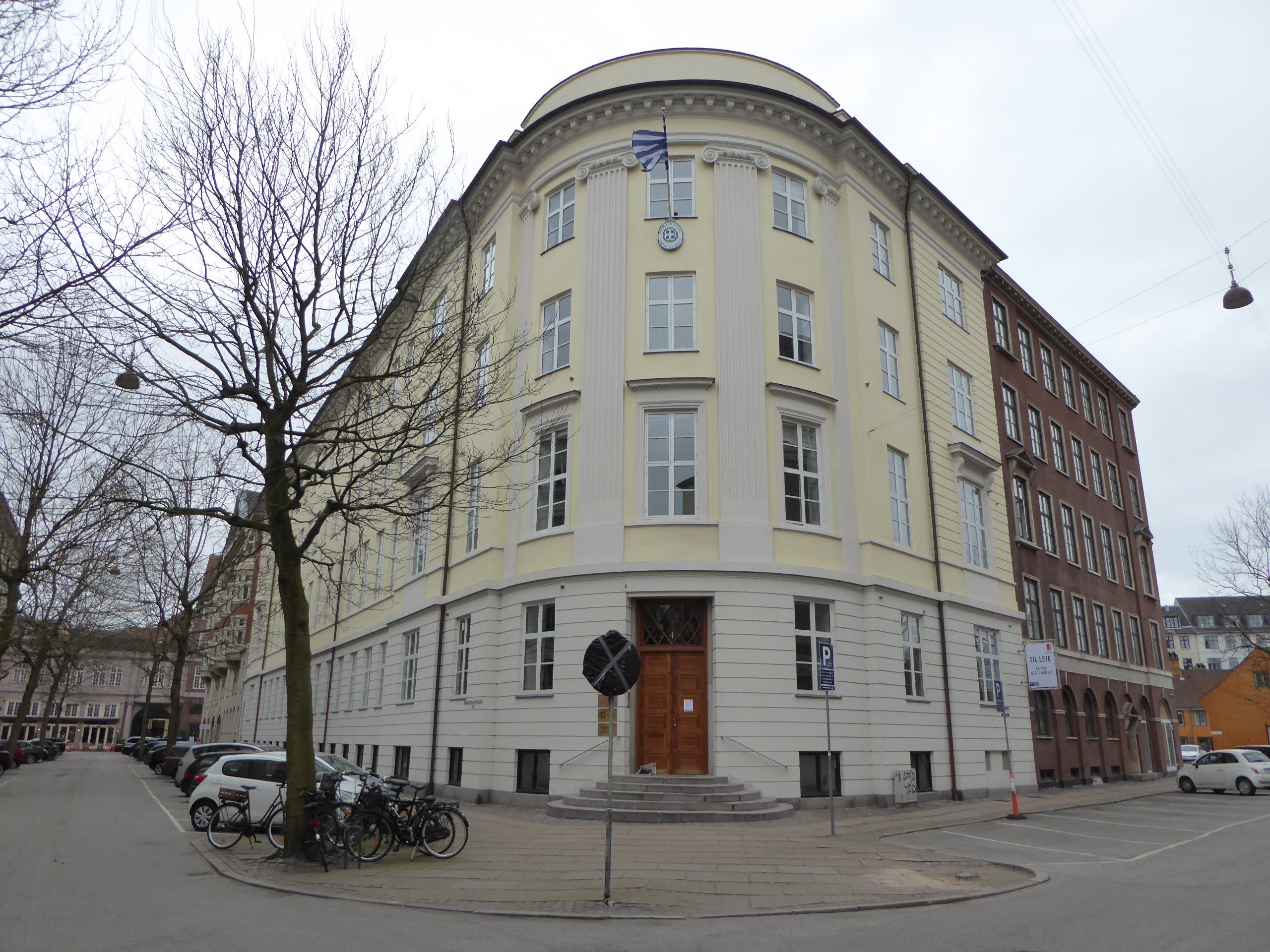
Embassy in Copenhagen

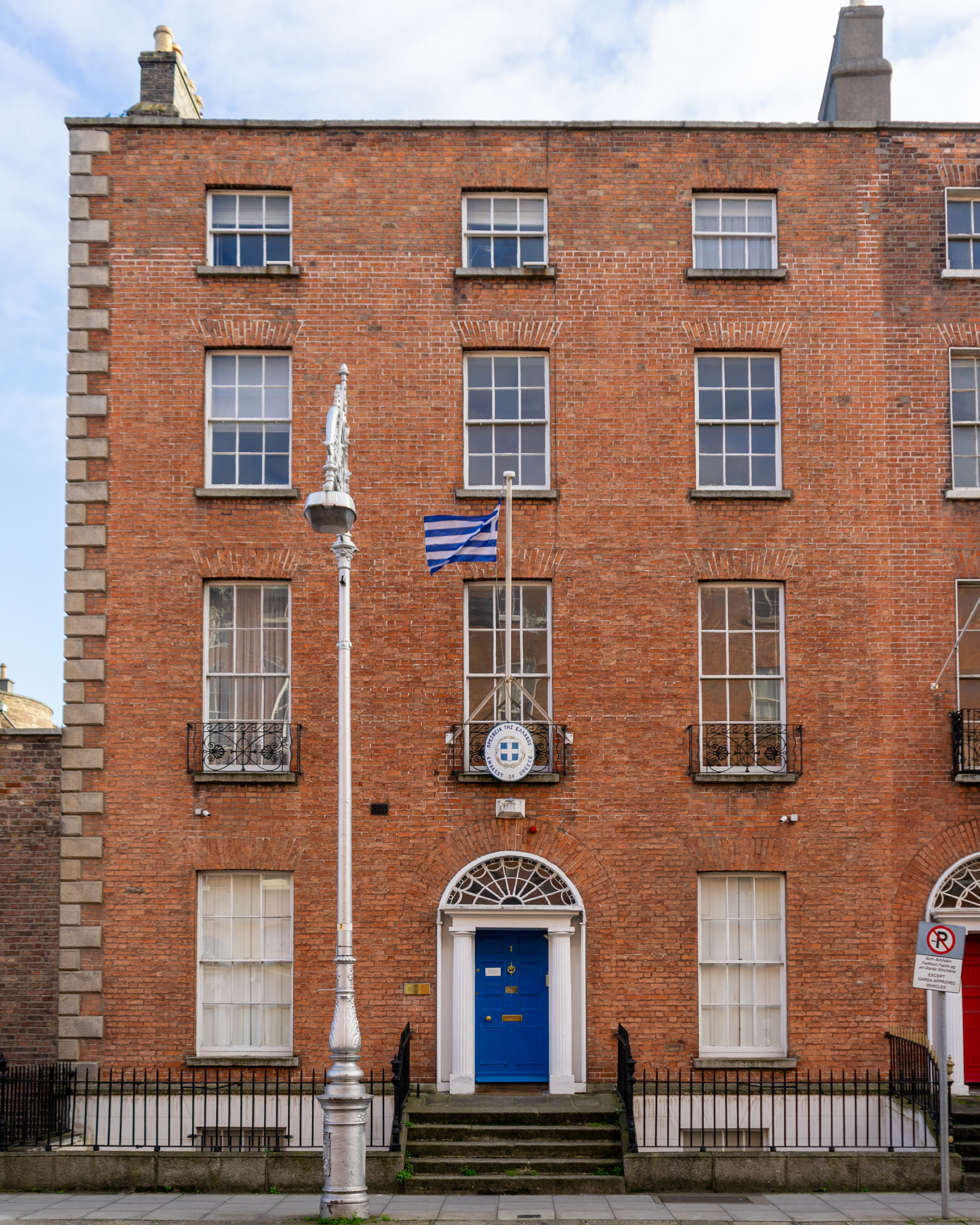
Embassy in Dublin

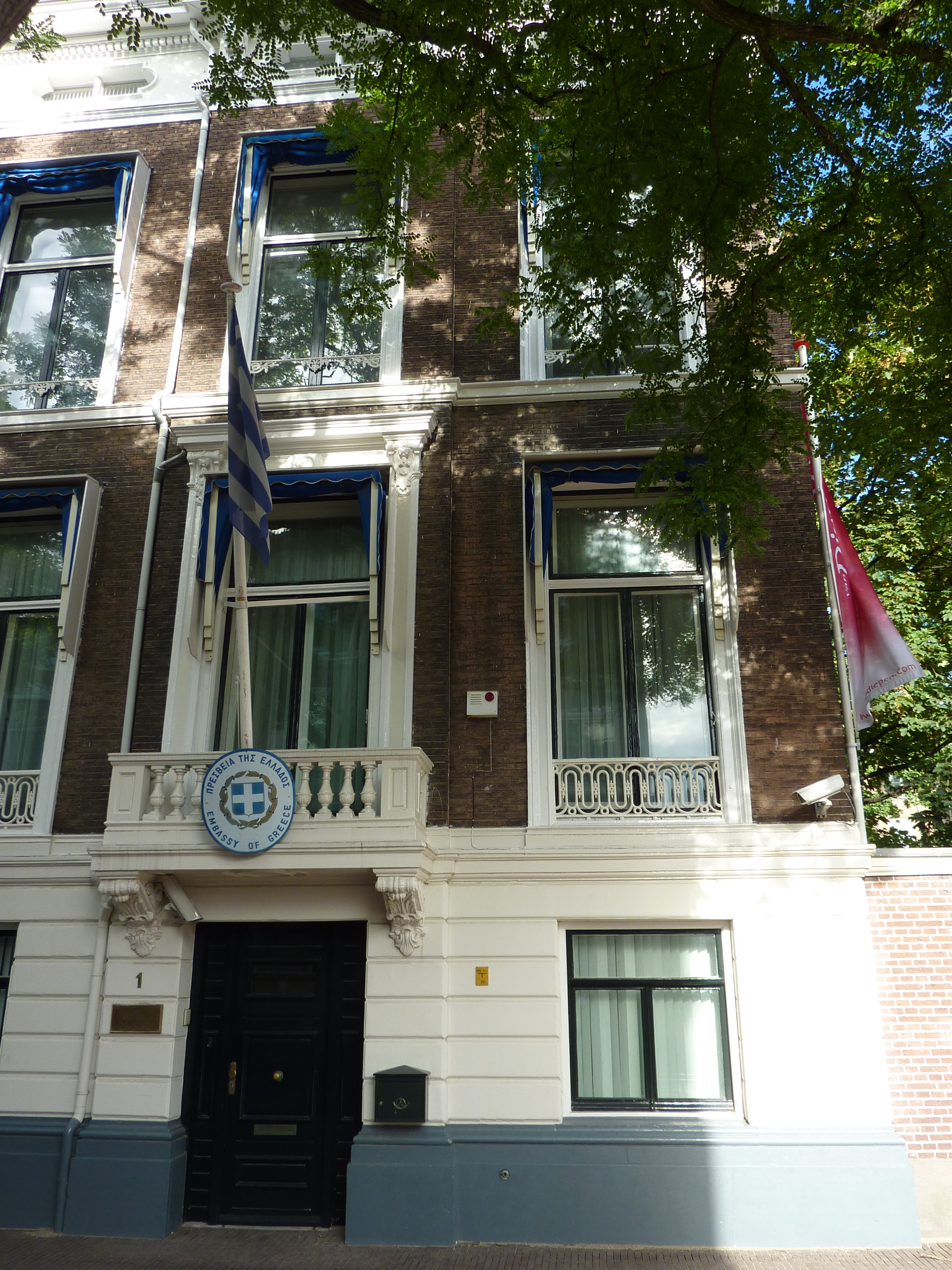
Embassy in The Hague

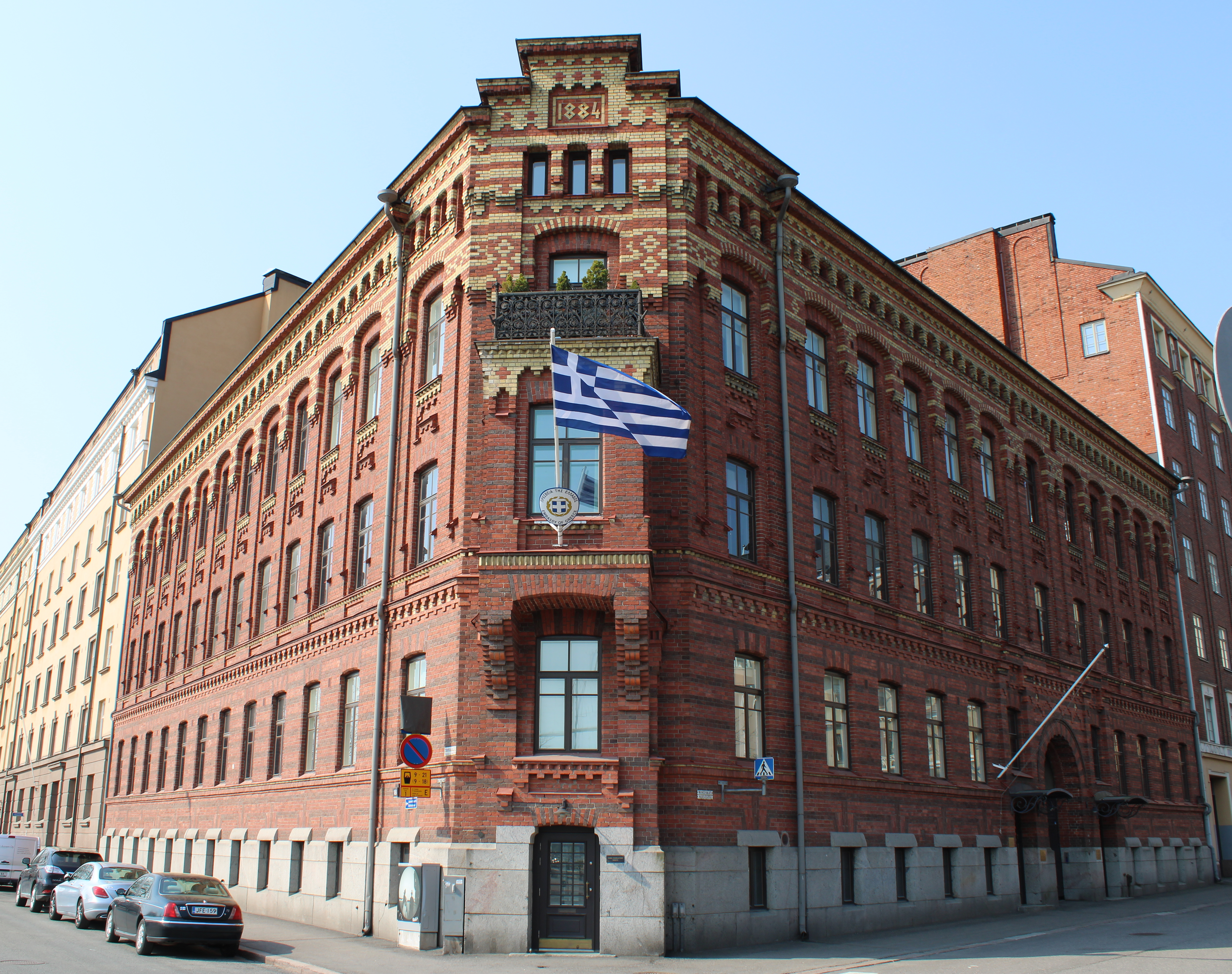
Embassy in Helsinki

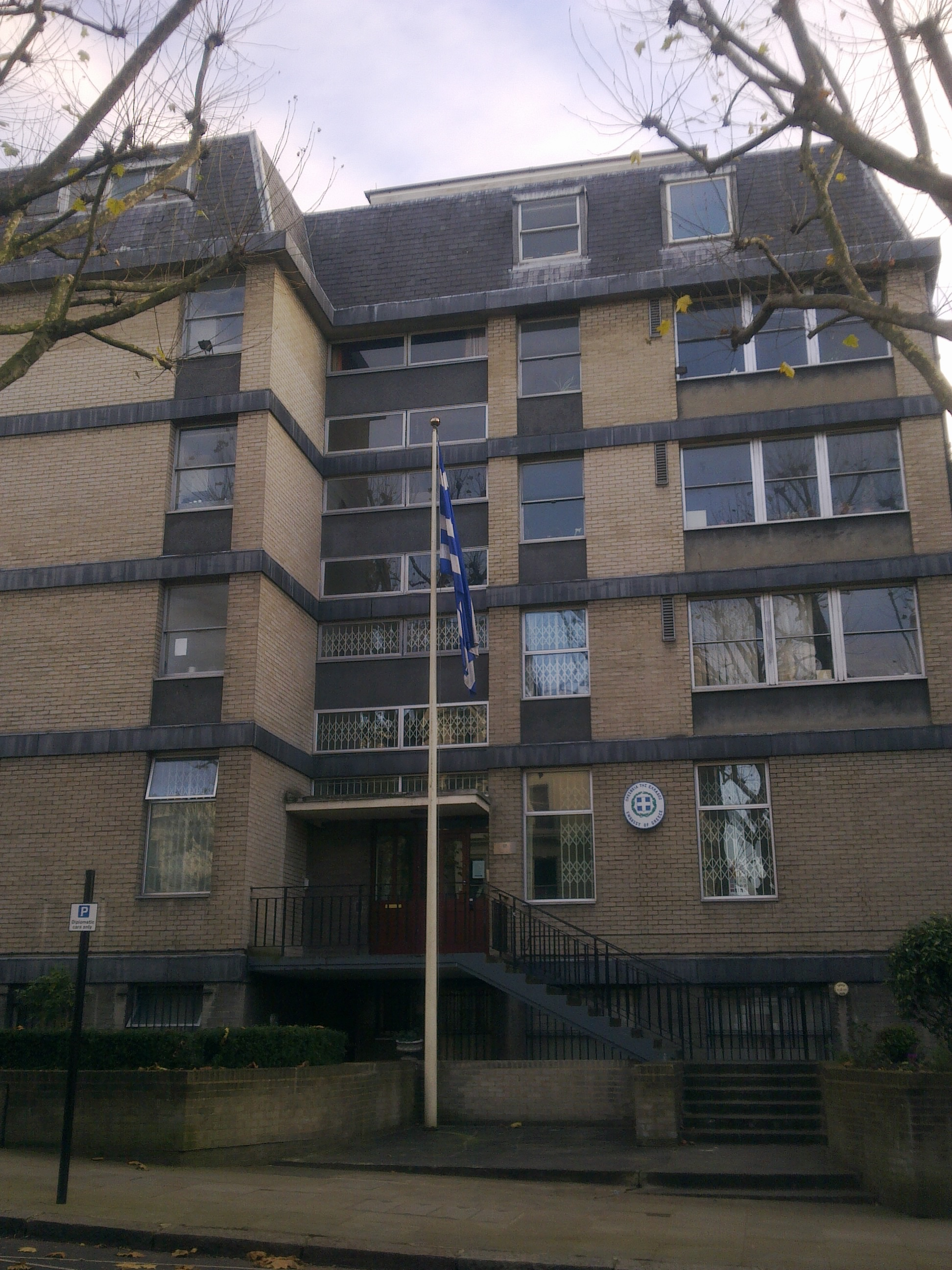
Embassy in London

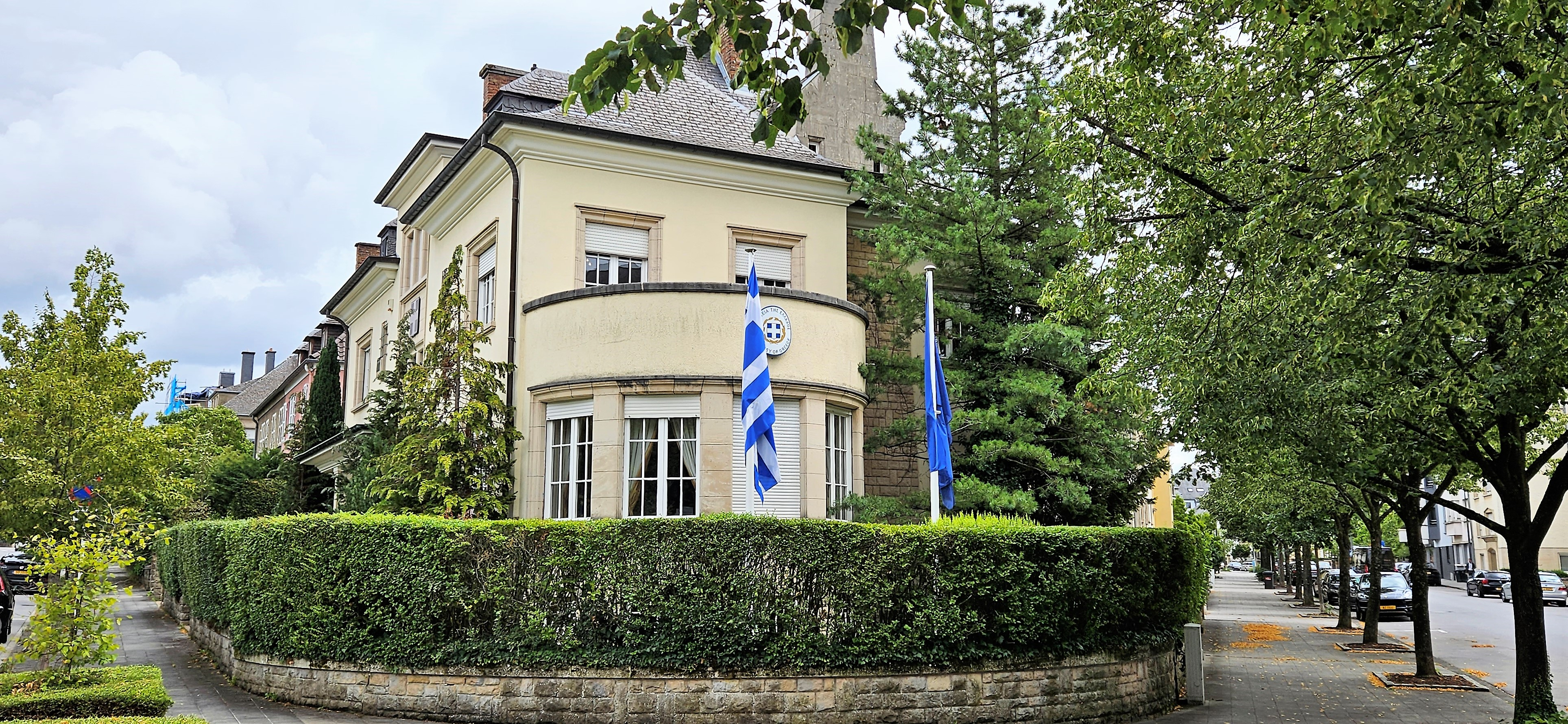
Embassy in Luxembourg

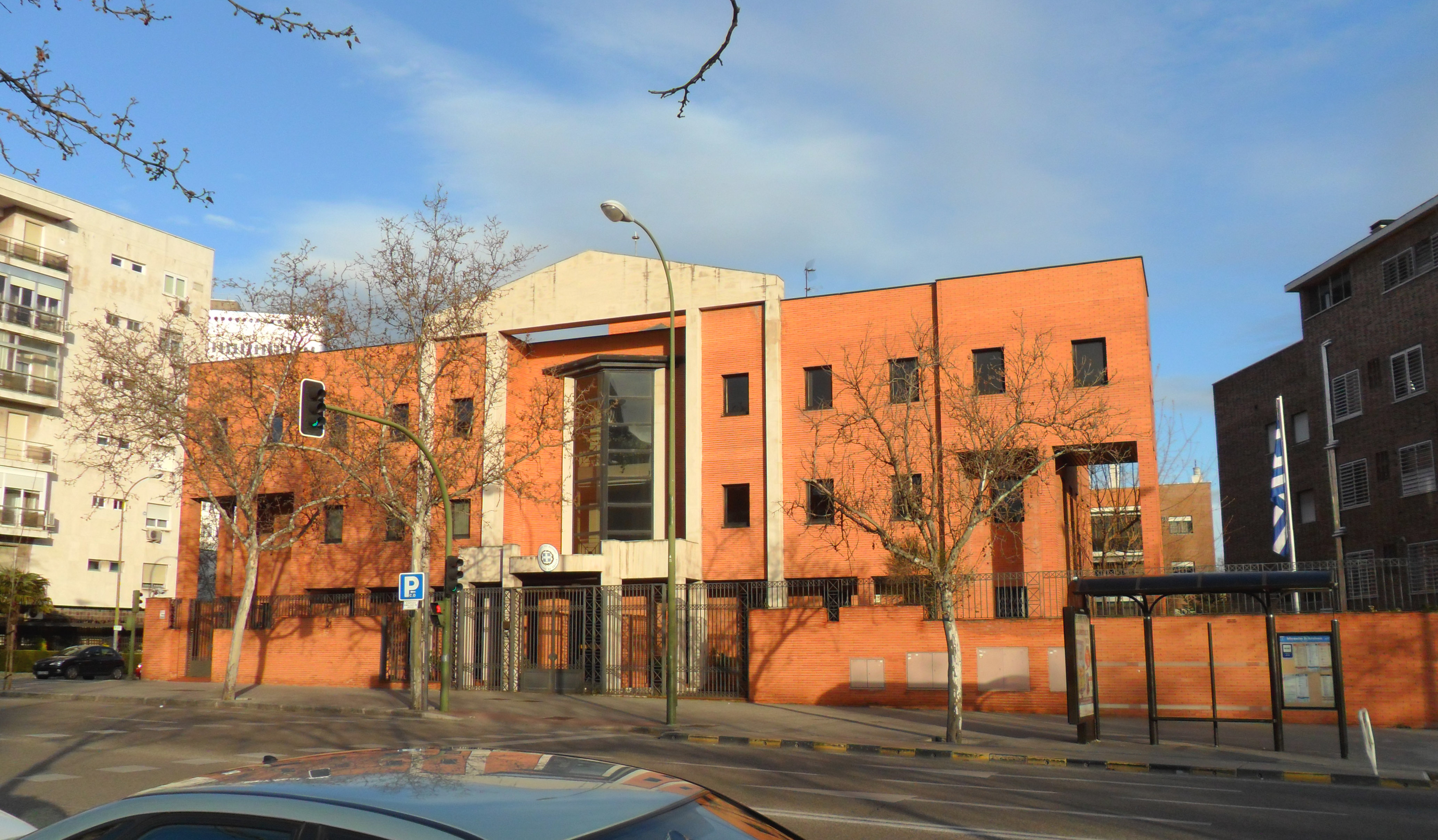
Embassy in Madrid

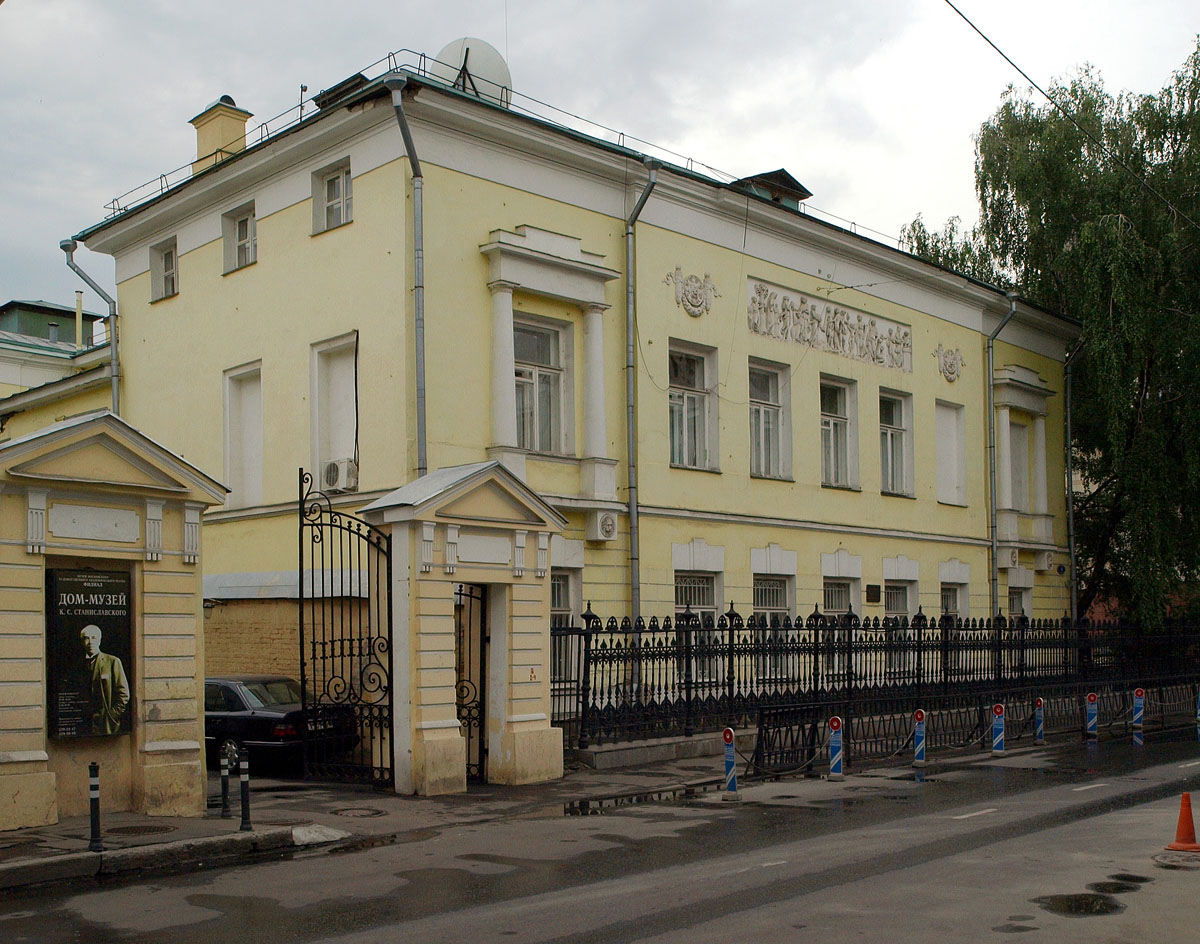
Embassy in Moscow

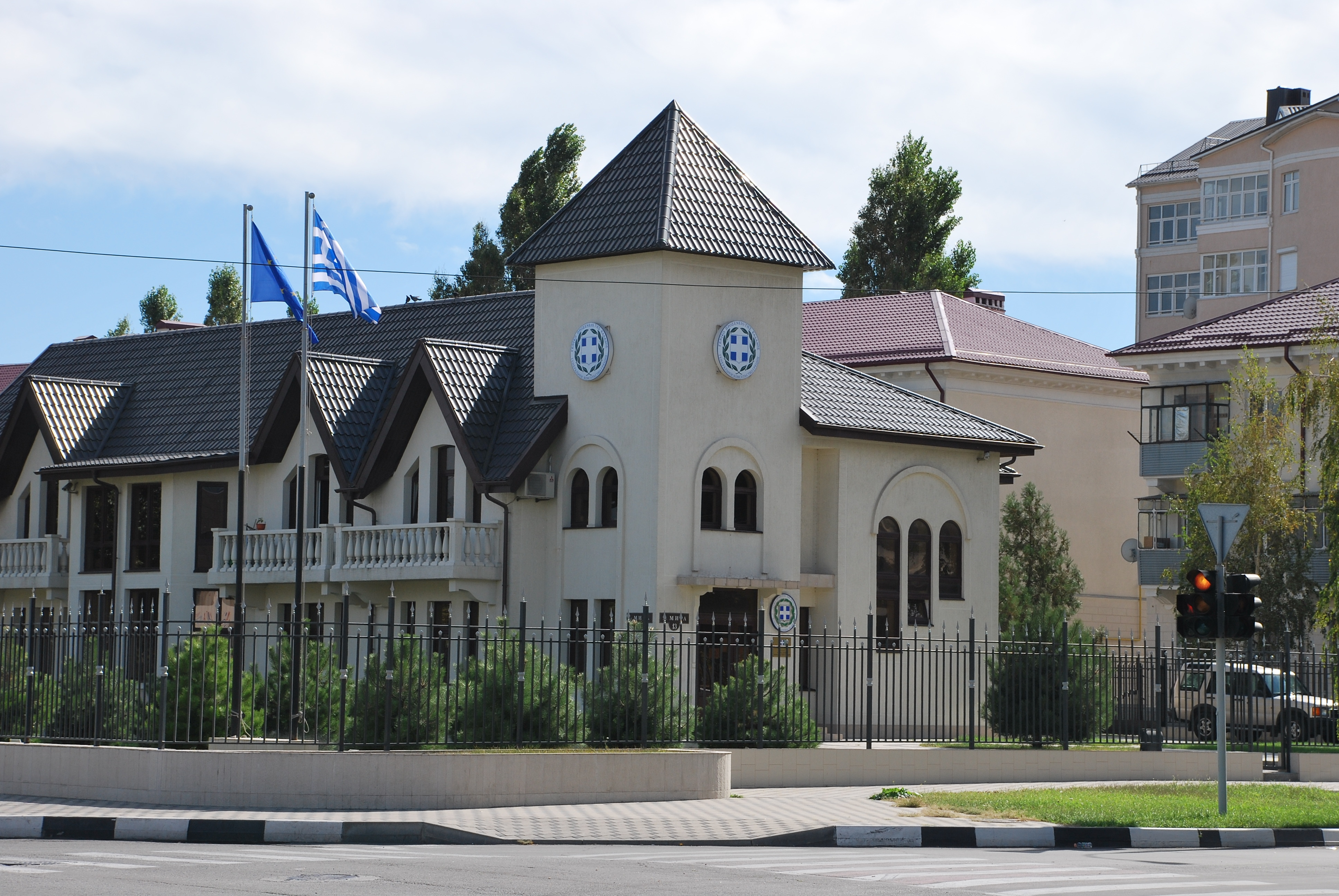
Consulate-General in Novorossiysk

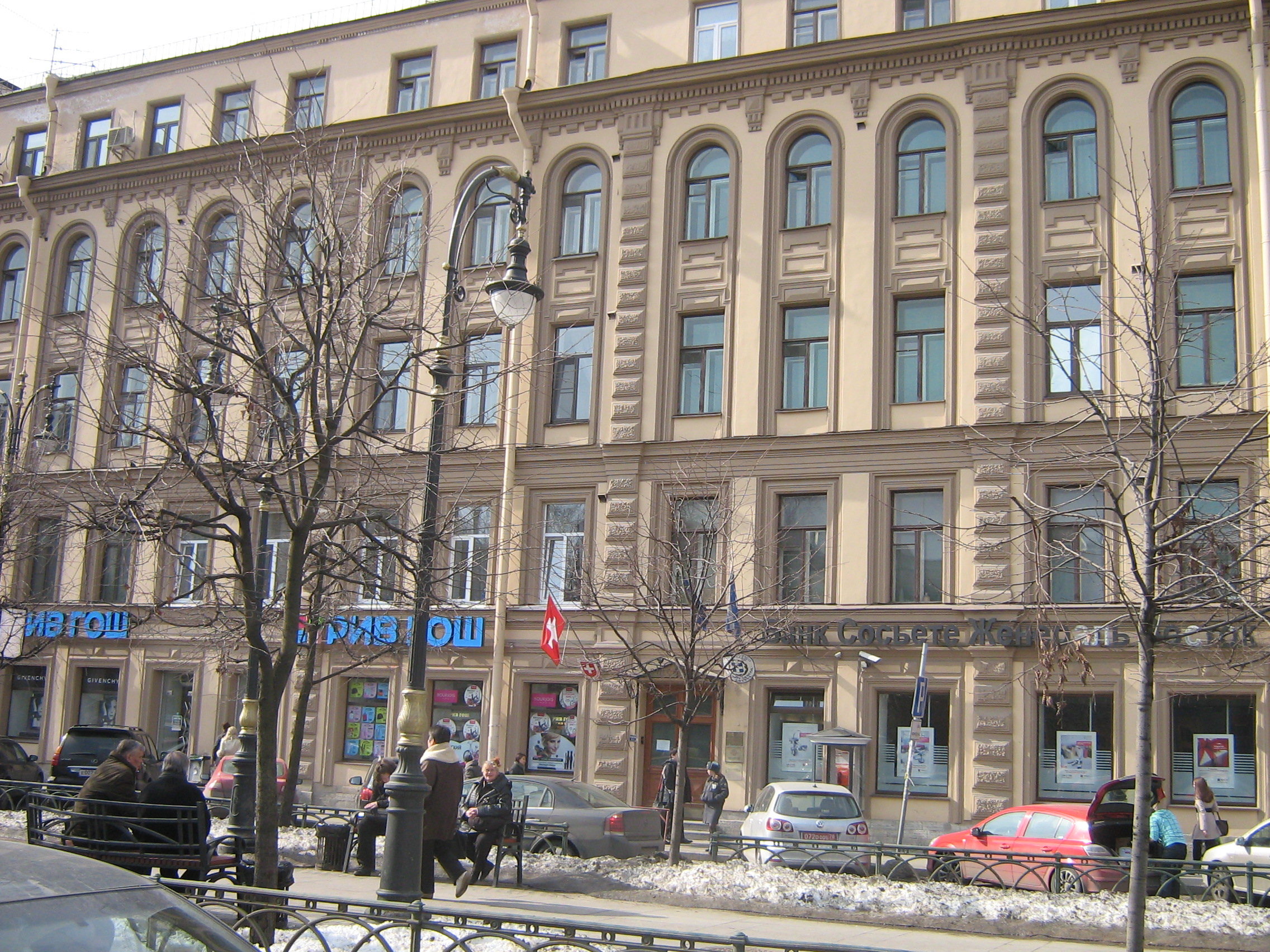
Consulate-General in Saint Petersburg

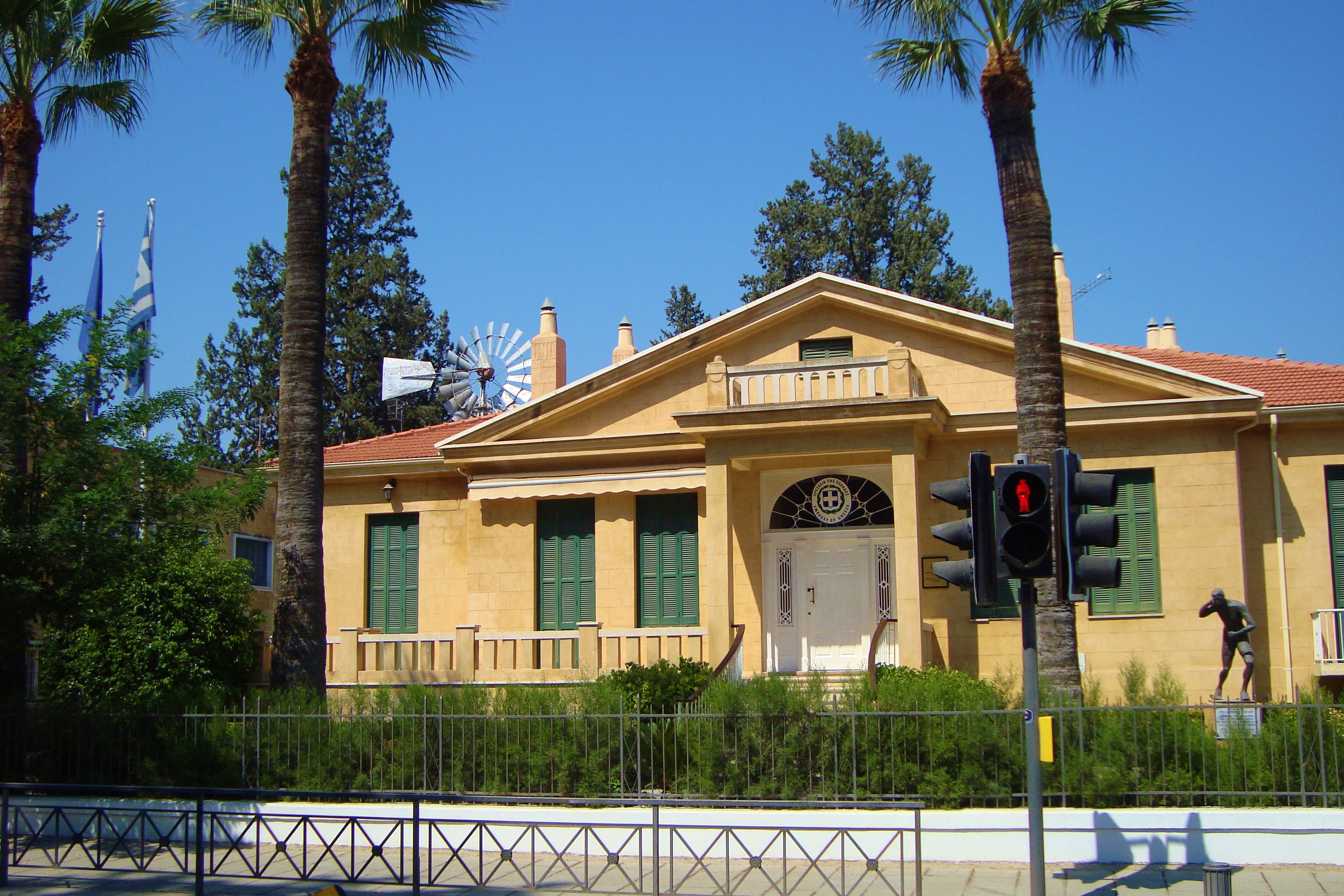
Embassy in Nicosia

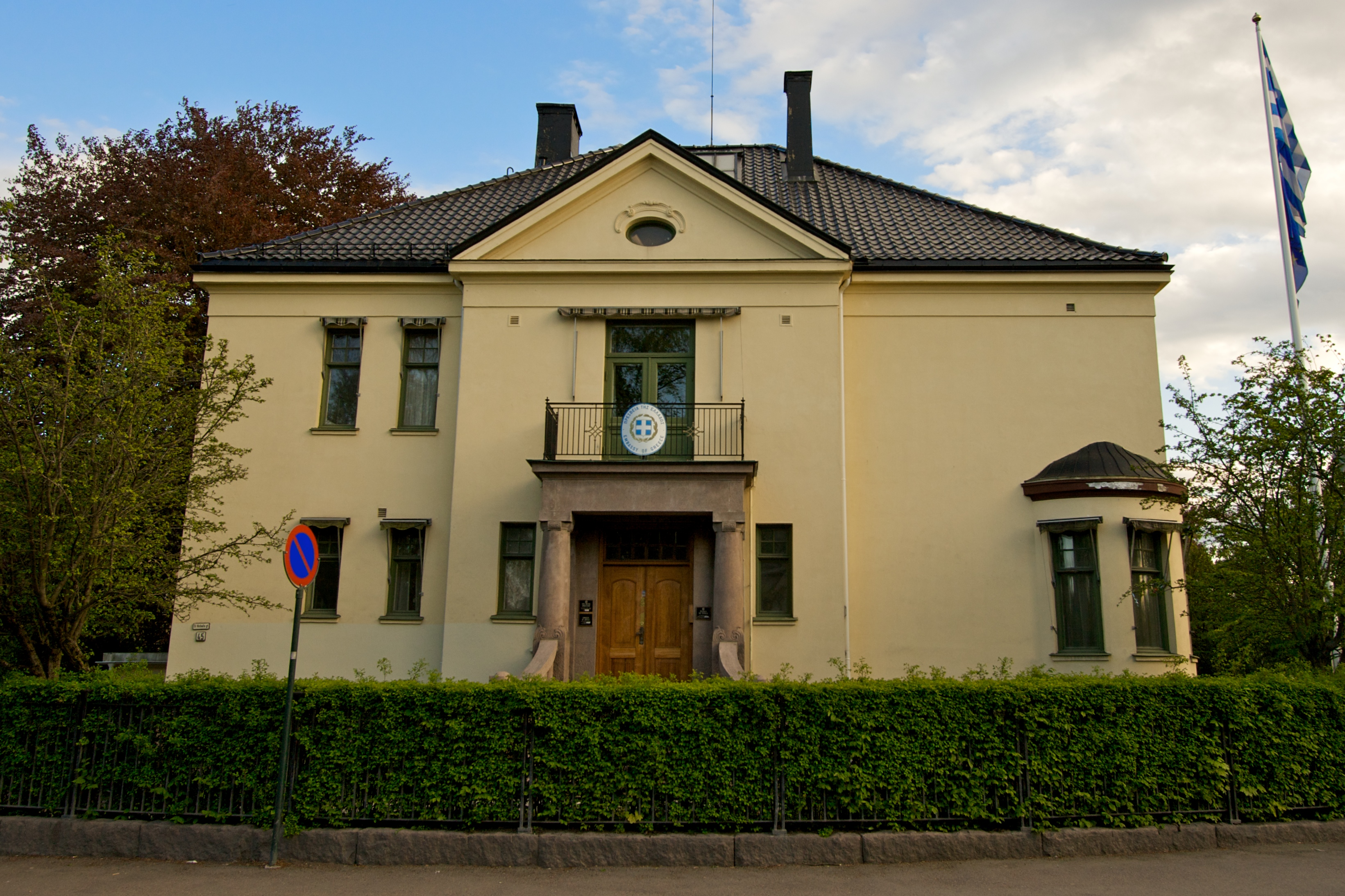
Embassy in Oslo

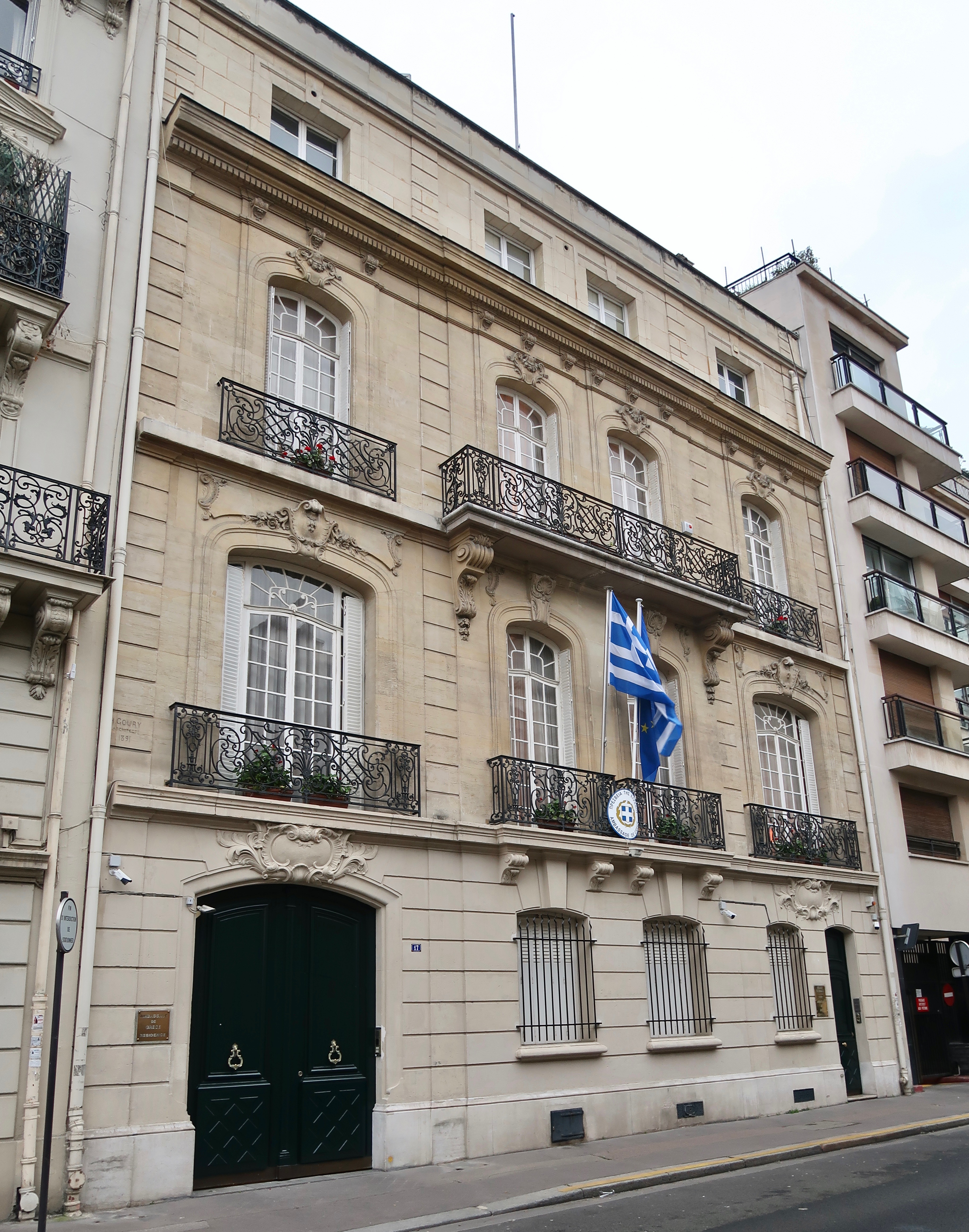
Embassy in Paris

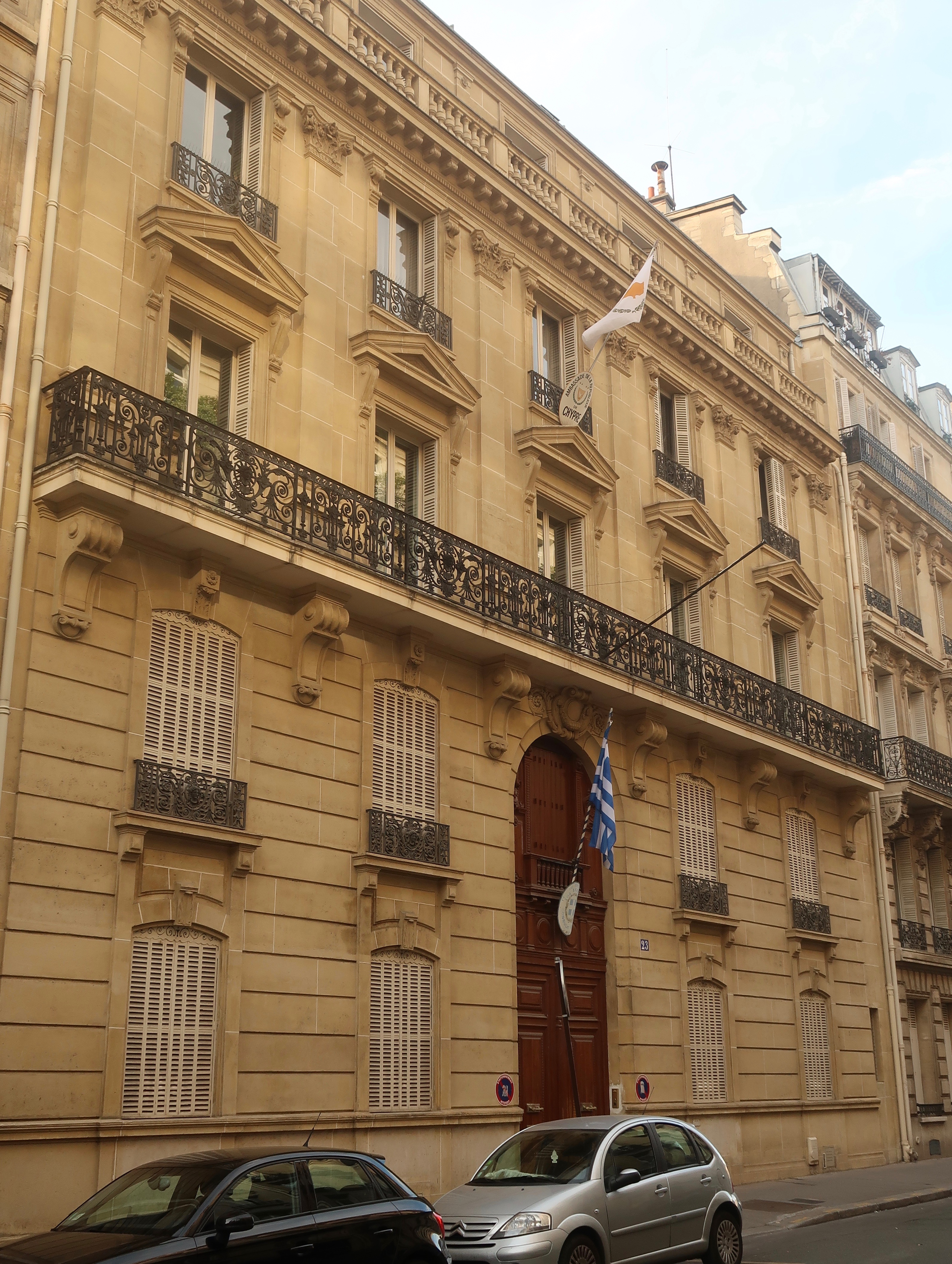
Building hosting the Consular section of the Embassy in Paris

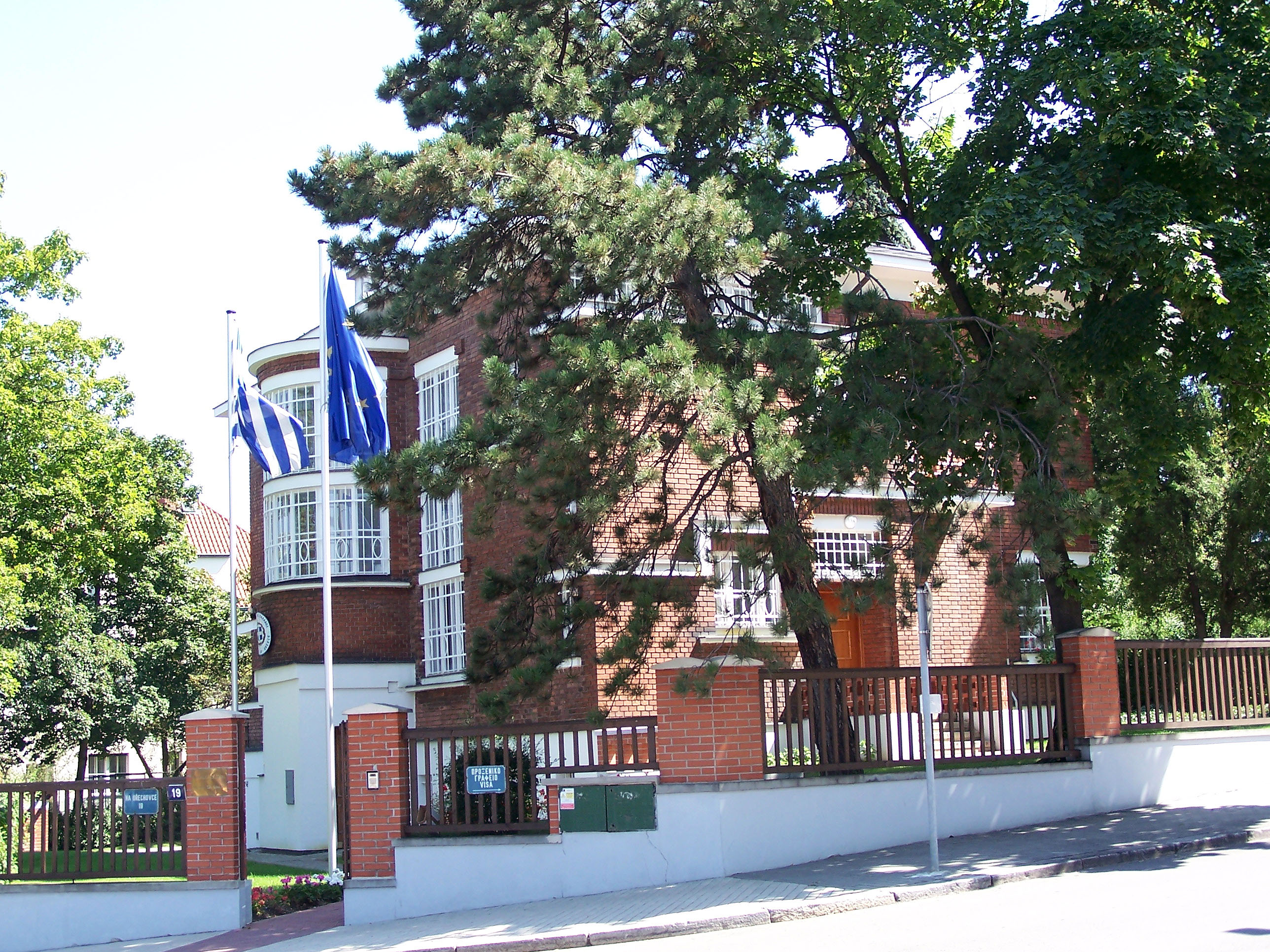
Embassy in Prague

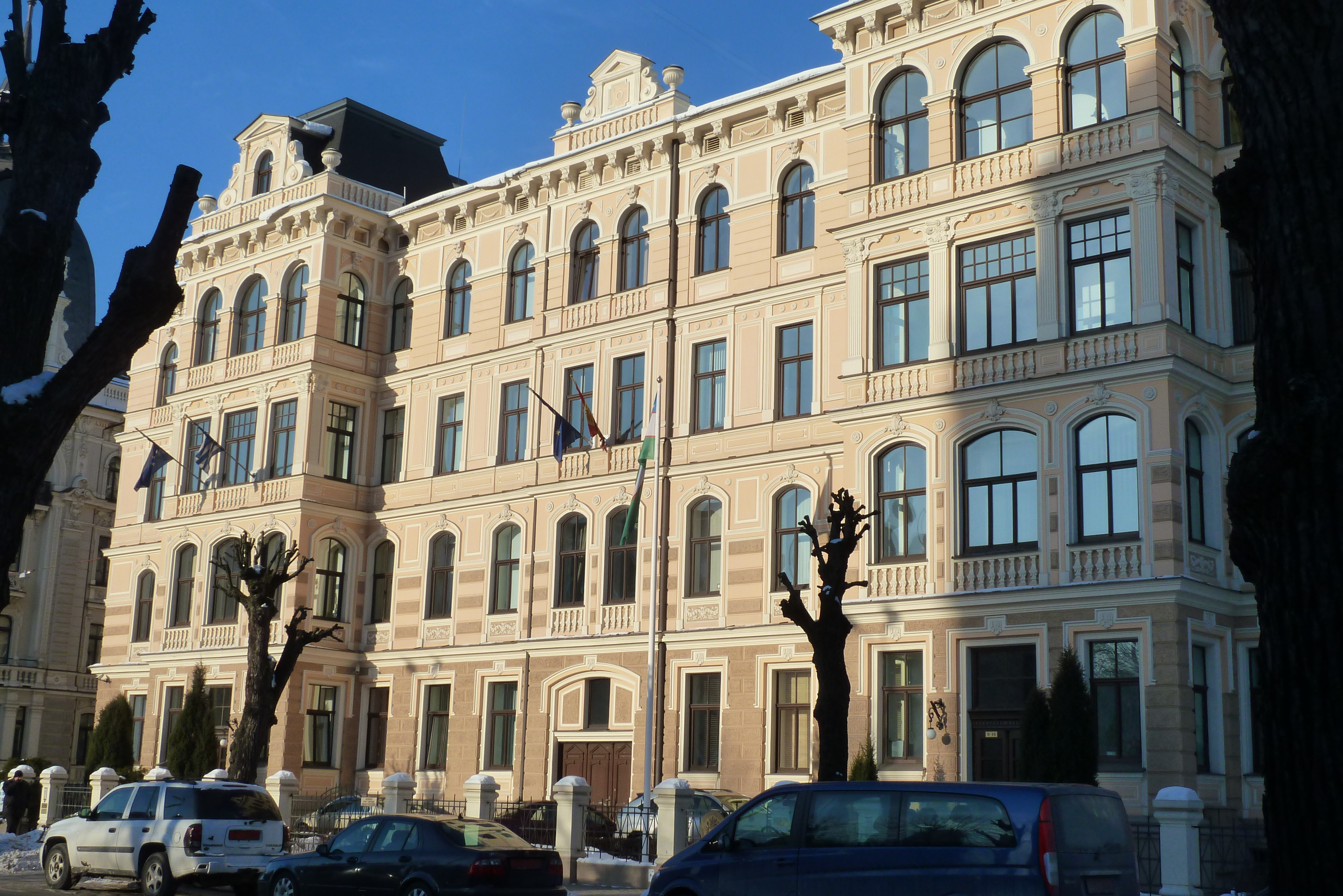
Embassy in Riga

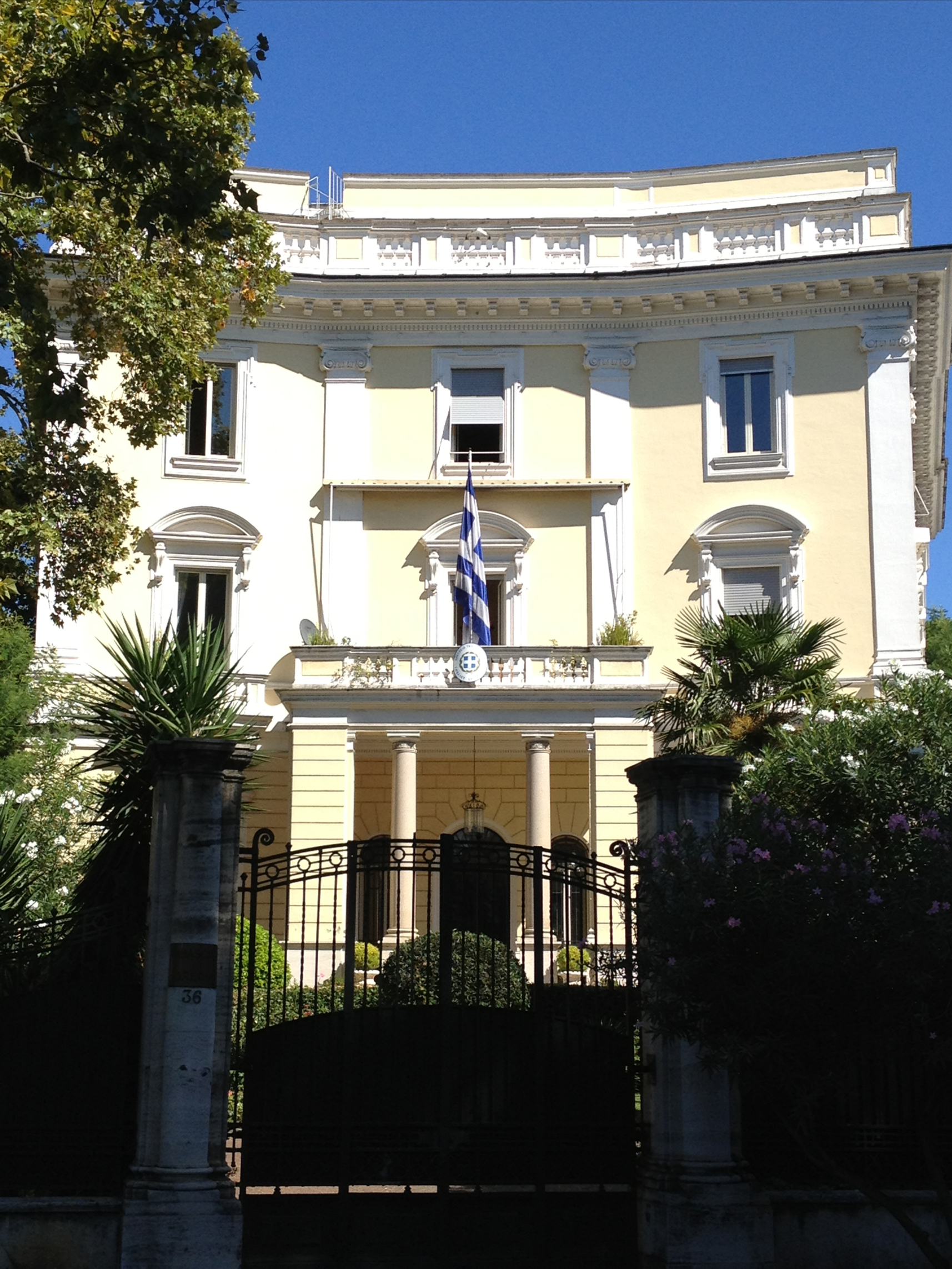
Embassy in Rome

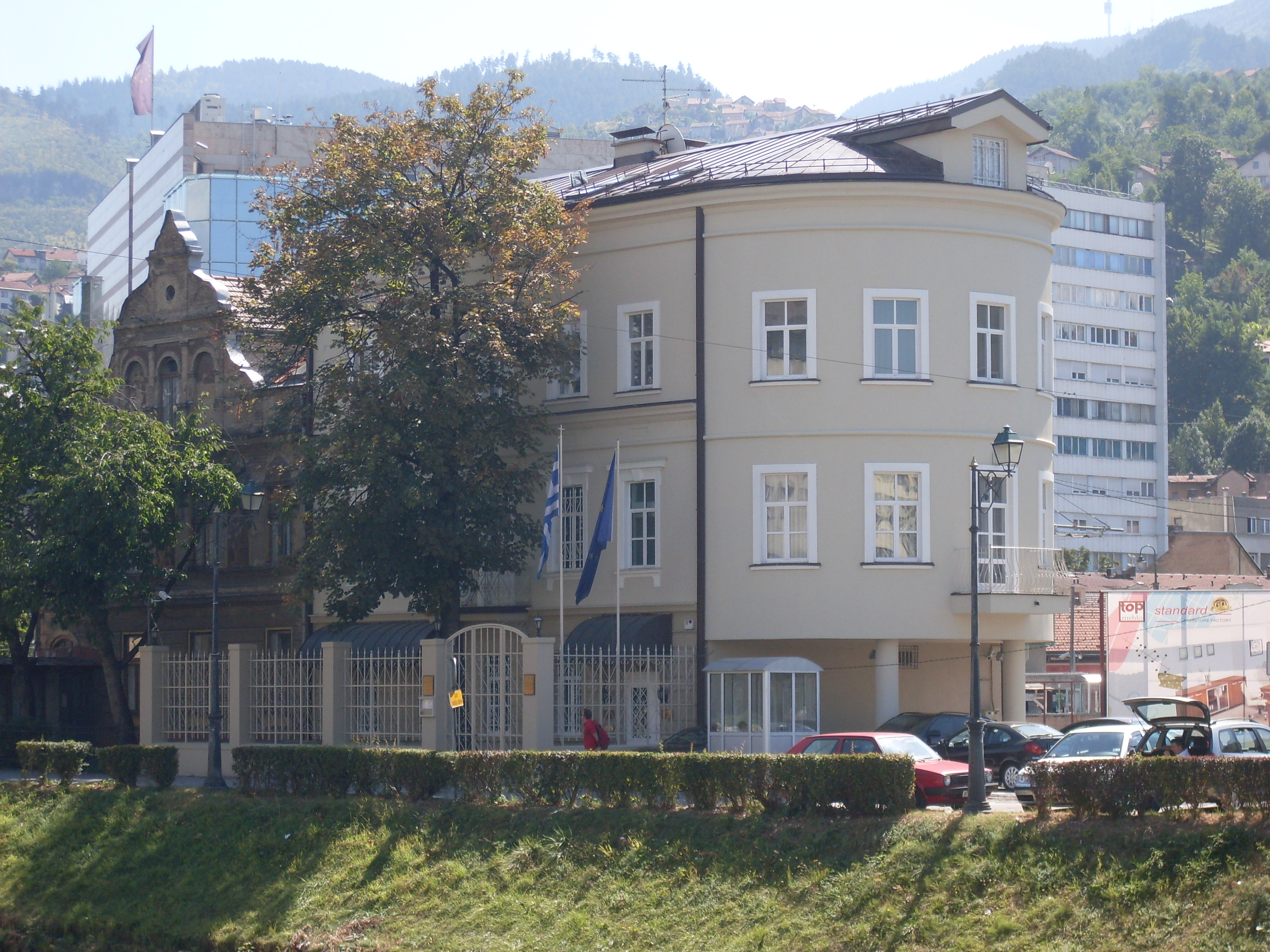
Embassy in Sarajevo

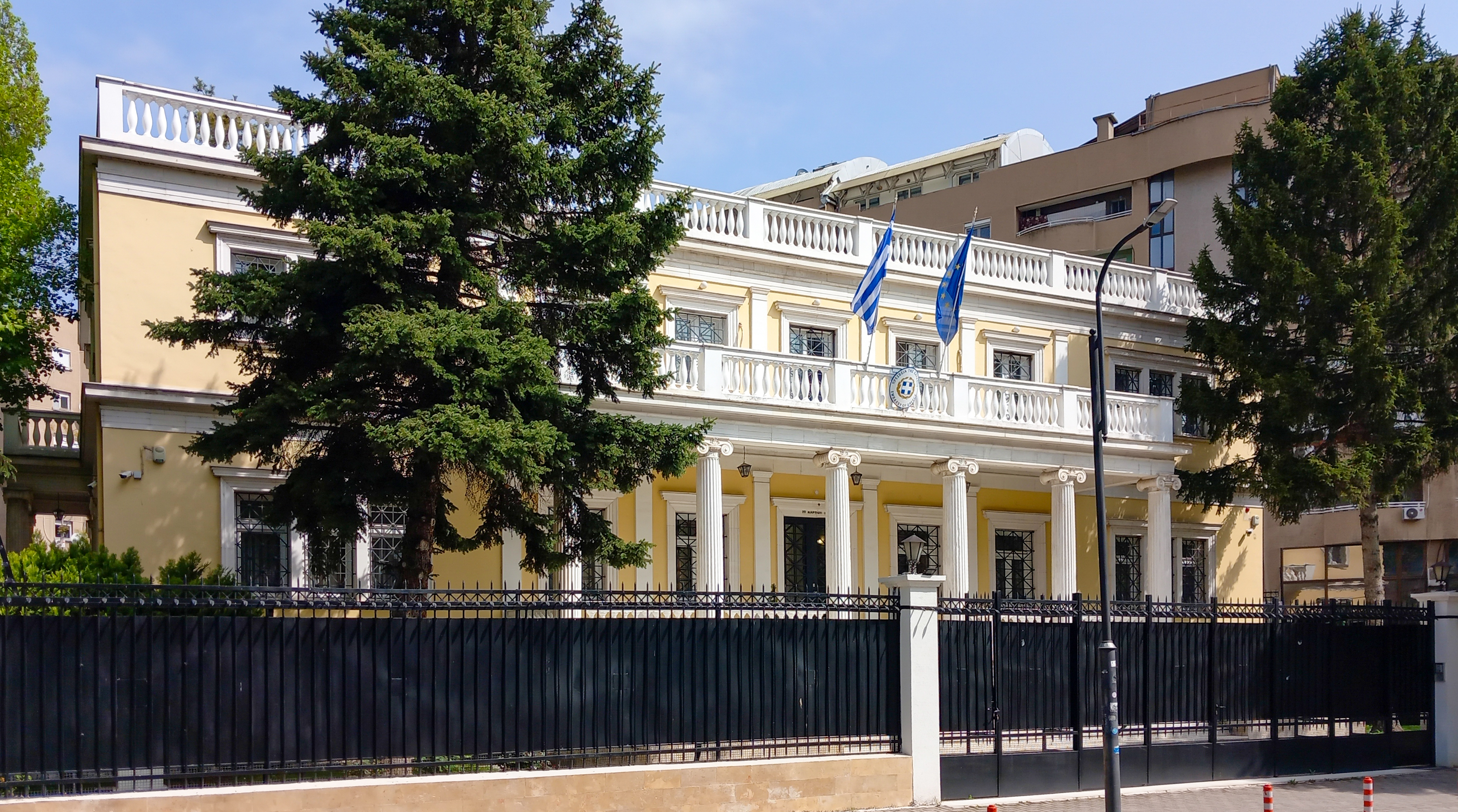
Embassy in Skopje

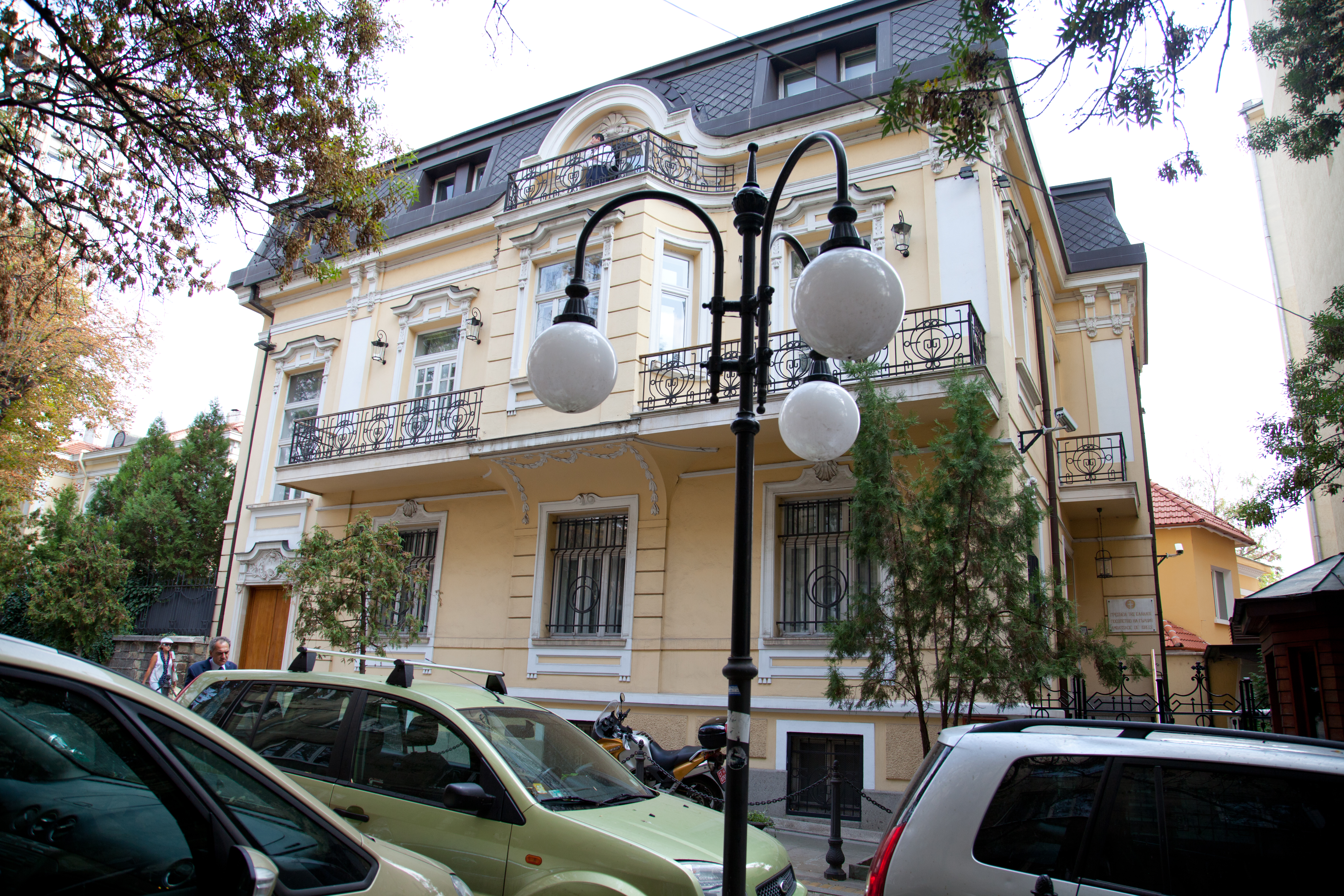
Embassy in Sofia

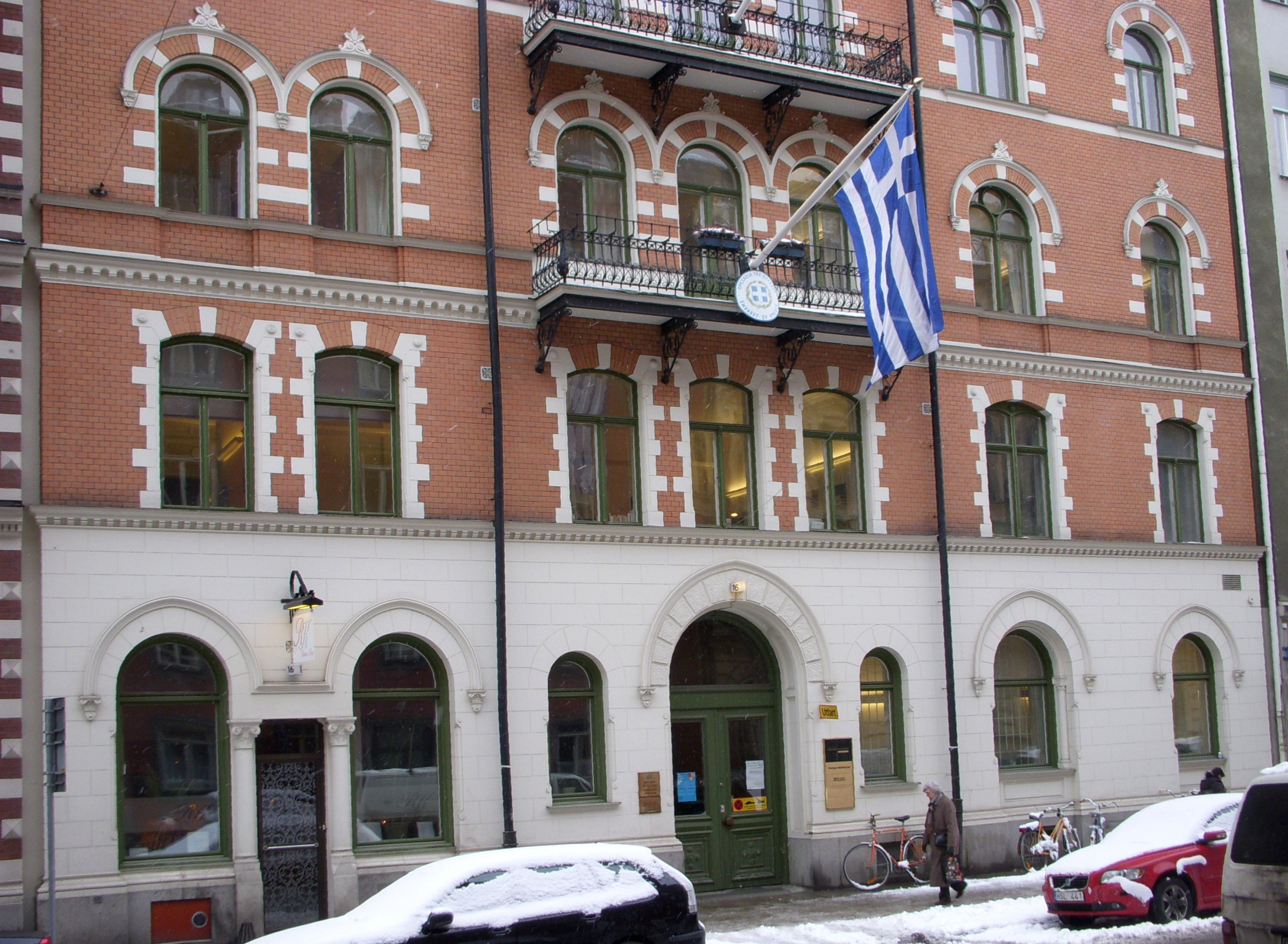
Embassy in Stockholm

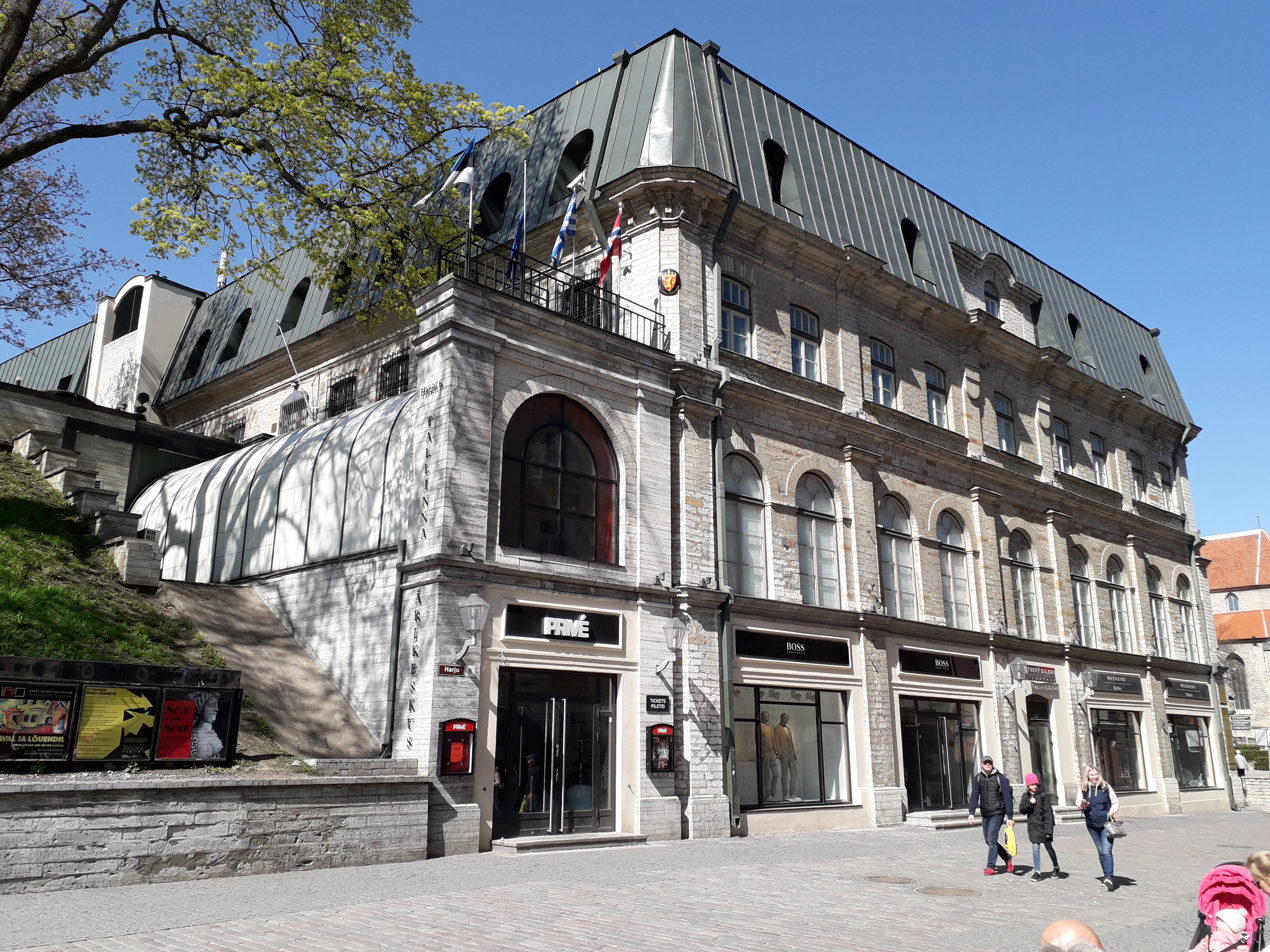
Embassy in Tallinn

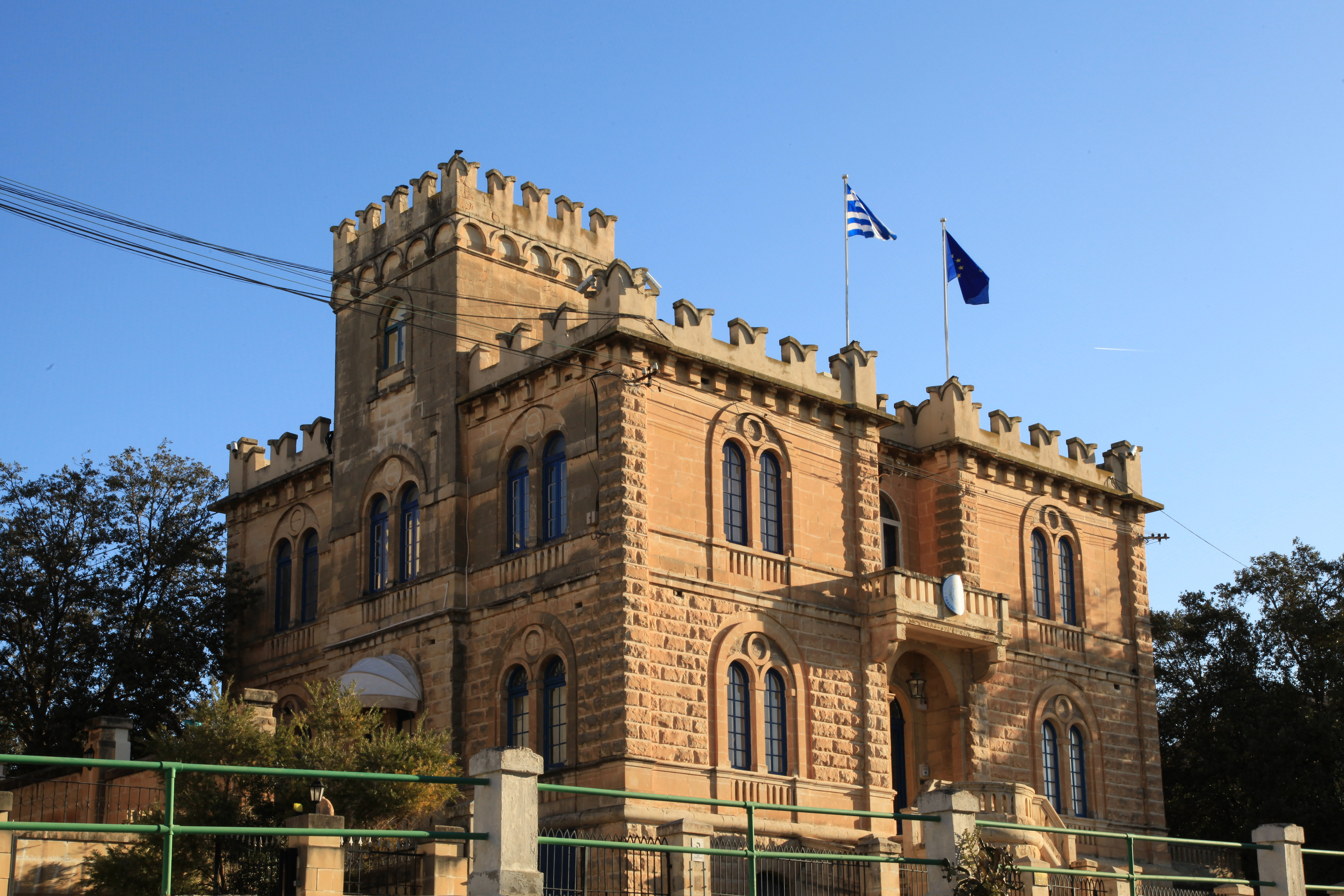
Embassy in Valletta

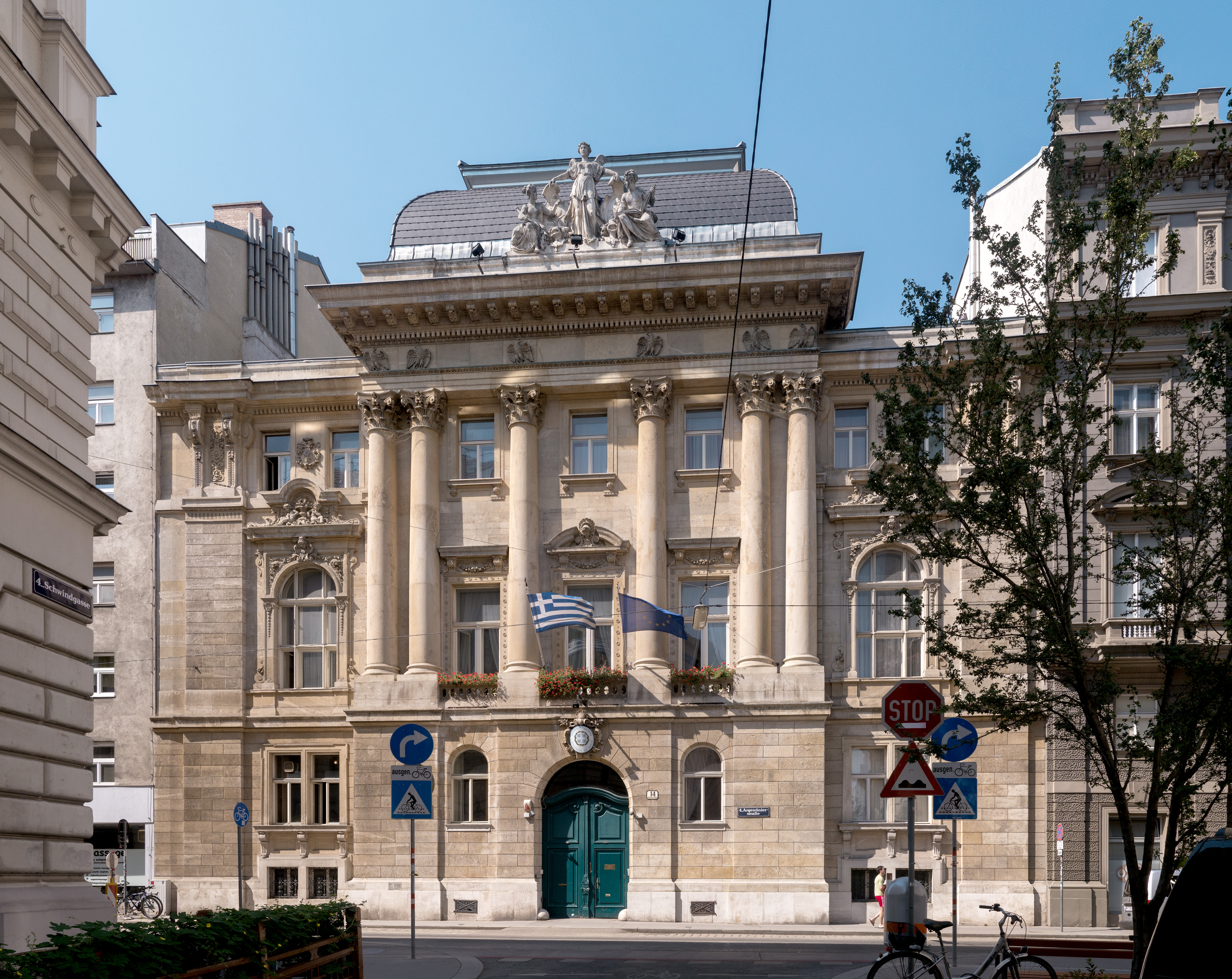
Embassy in Vienna

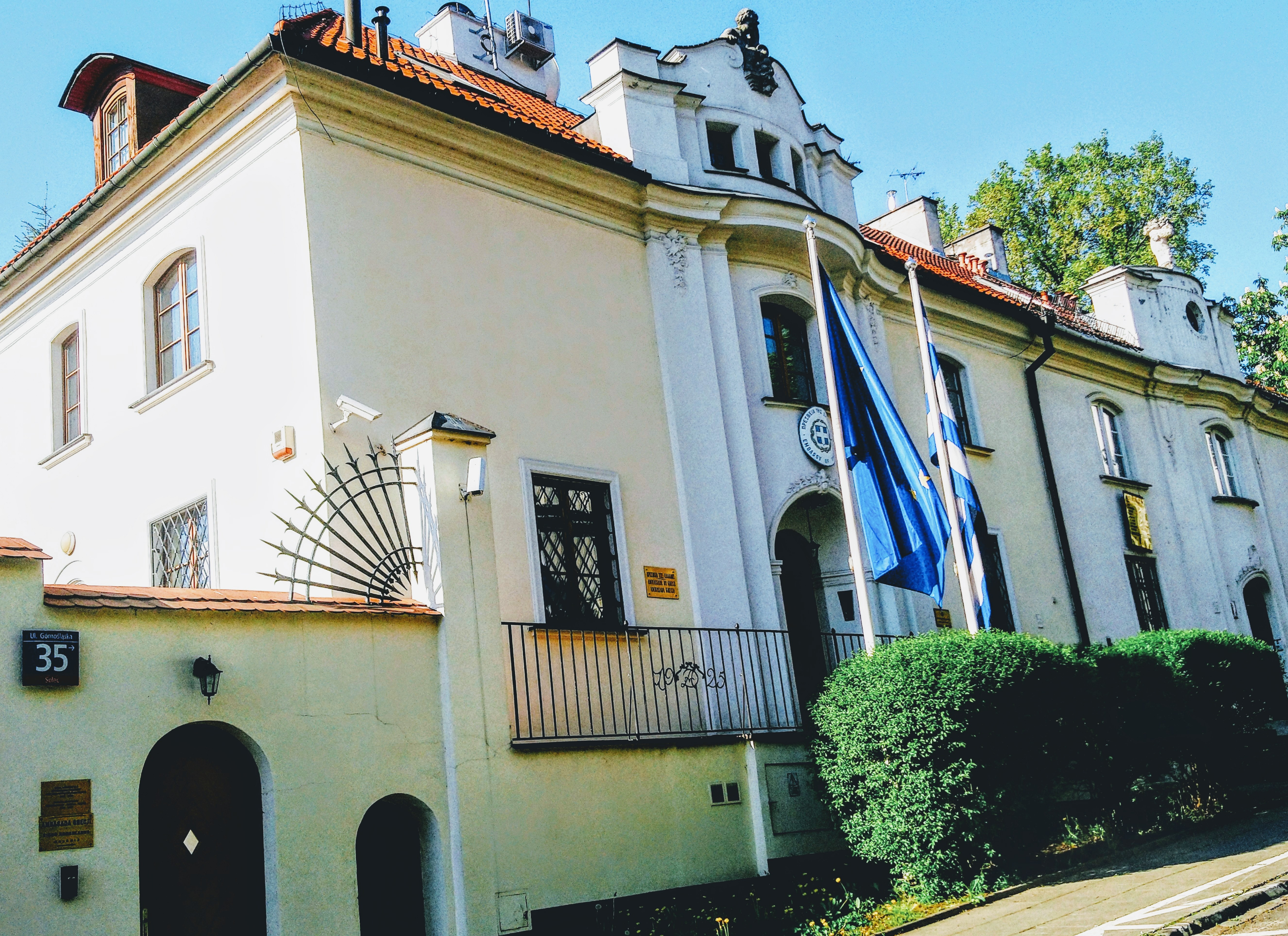
Embassy in Warsaw

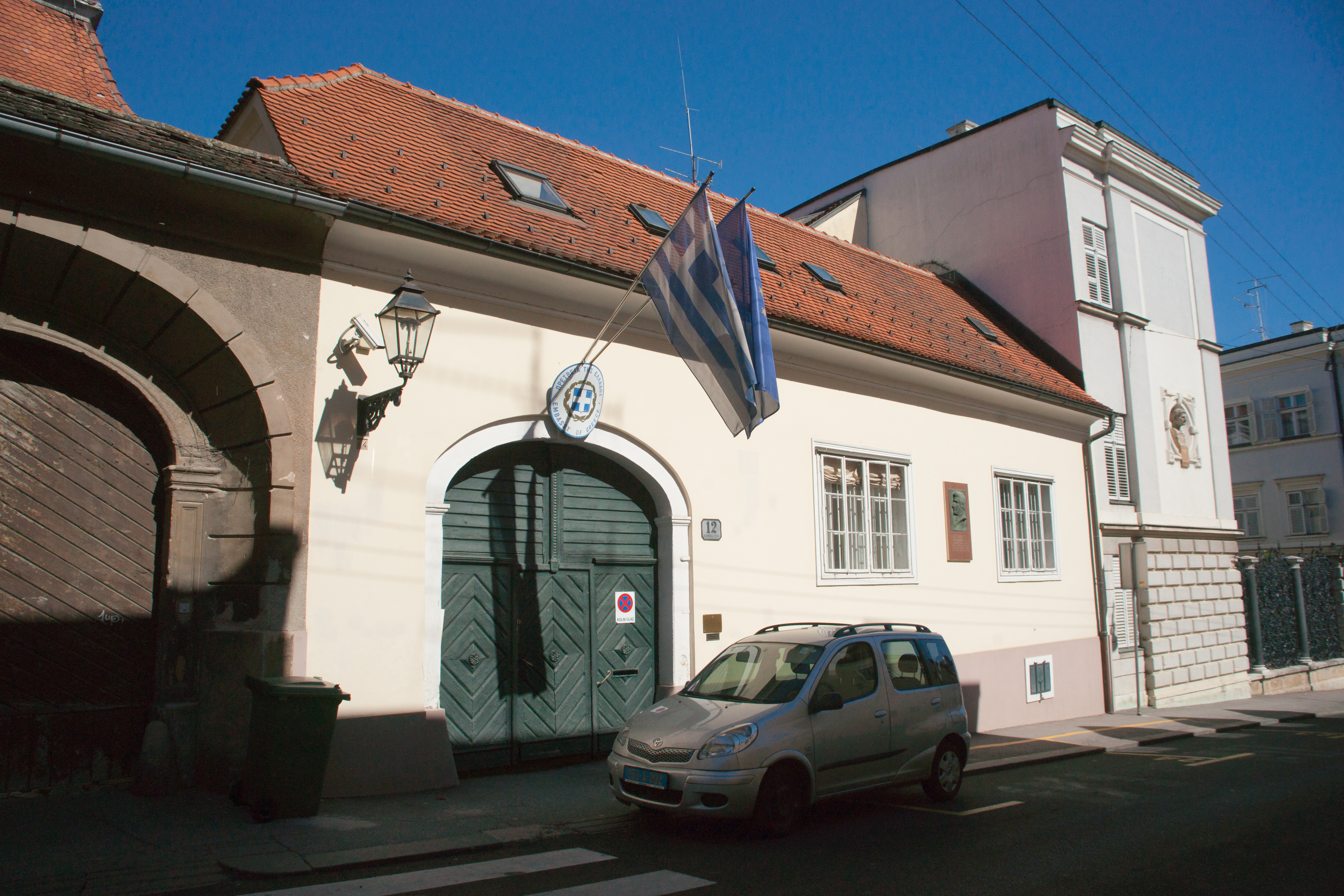
Embassy in Zagreb

=== Oceania ===
Host country	Host city	Mission	Concurrent accreditation	Ref.
Australia	Canberra	Embassy	Countries: Fiji; Kiribati; Nauru; New Zealand; Papua New Guinea; Samoa; Solomon Islands; Tonga	
Australia	Adelaide	Consulate-General	Countries: Fiji; Kiribati; Nauru; New Zealand; Papua New Guinea; Samoa; Solomon Islands; Tonga	
Australia	Melbourne	Consulate-General	Countries: Fiji; Kiribati; Nauru; New Zealand; Papua New Guinea; Samoa; Solomon Islands; Tonga	
Australia	Sydney	Consulate-General	Countries: Fiji; Kiribati; Nauru; New Zealand; Papua New Guinea; Samoa; Solomon Islands; Tonga	
Australia	Perth	Consulate	Countries: Fiji; Kiribati; Nauru; New Zealand; Papua New Guinea; Samoa; Solomon Islands; Tonga	

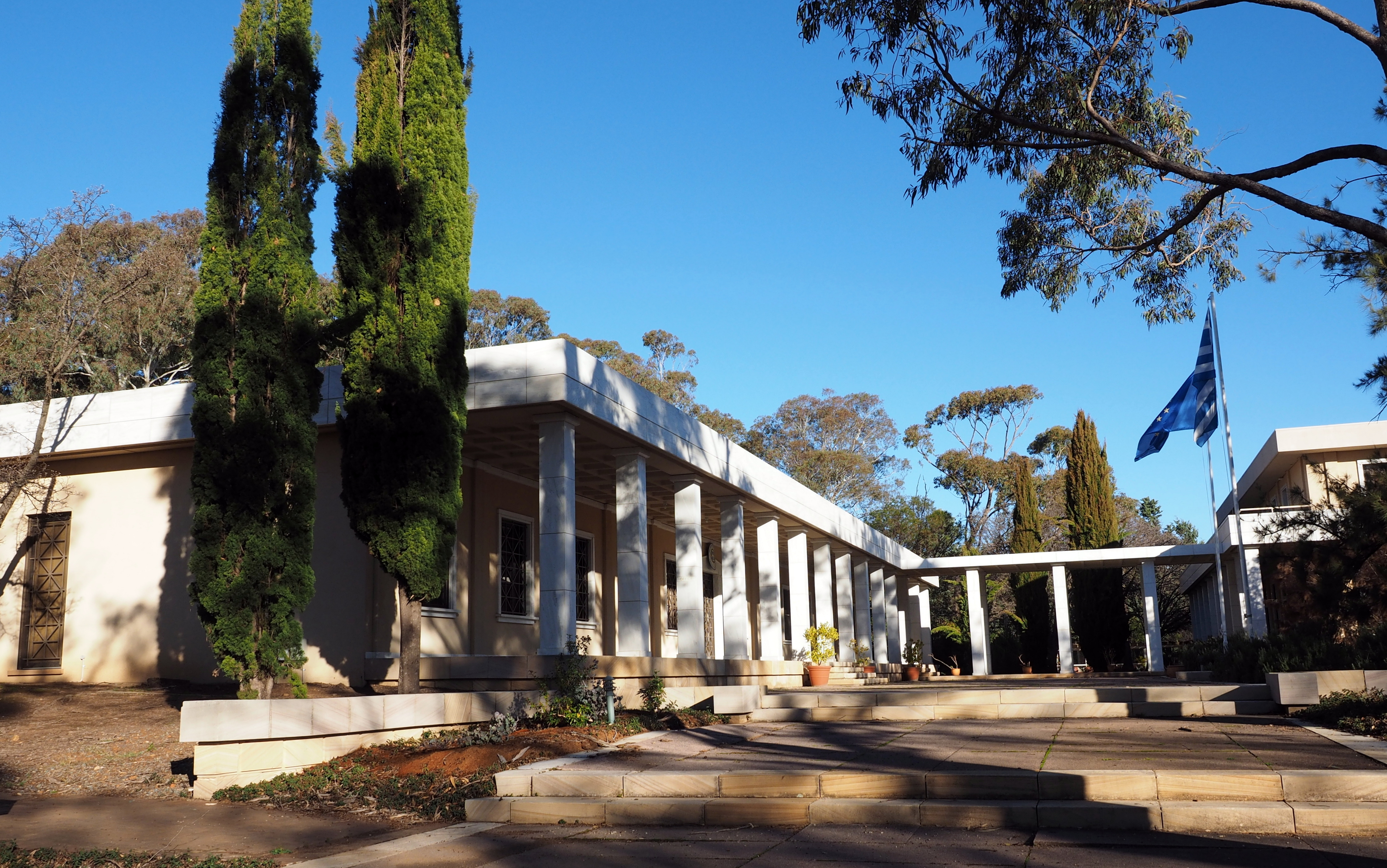
Embassy in Canberra

=== Multilateral organizations ===
Organization	Host city	Host country	Mission	Concurrent accreditation	Ref.
Council of Europe	Strasbourg	France	Permanent Mission		
European Union	Brussels	Belgium	Permanent Representation		
International Civil Aviation Organization	Montreal	Canada	Permanent Mission		
NATO	Brussels	Belgium	Permanent Representation		
OECD	Paris	France	Permanent Mission		
OSCE	Vienna	Austria	Permanent Representation		
United Nations	New York City	United States	Permanent Mission		
United Nations	Geneva	Switzerland	Permanent Mission	International Organizations: World Trade Organization	
UNESCO	Paris	France	Permanent Mission		

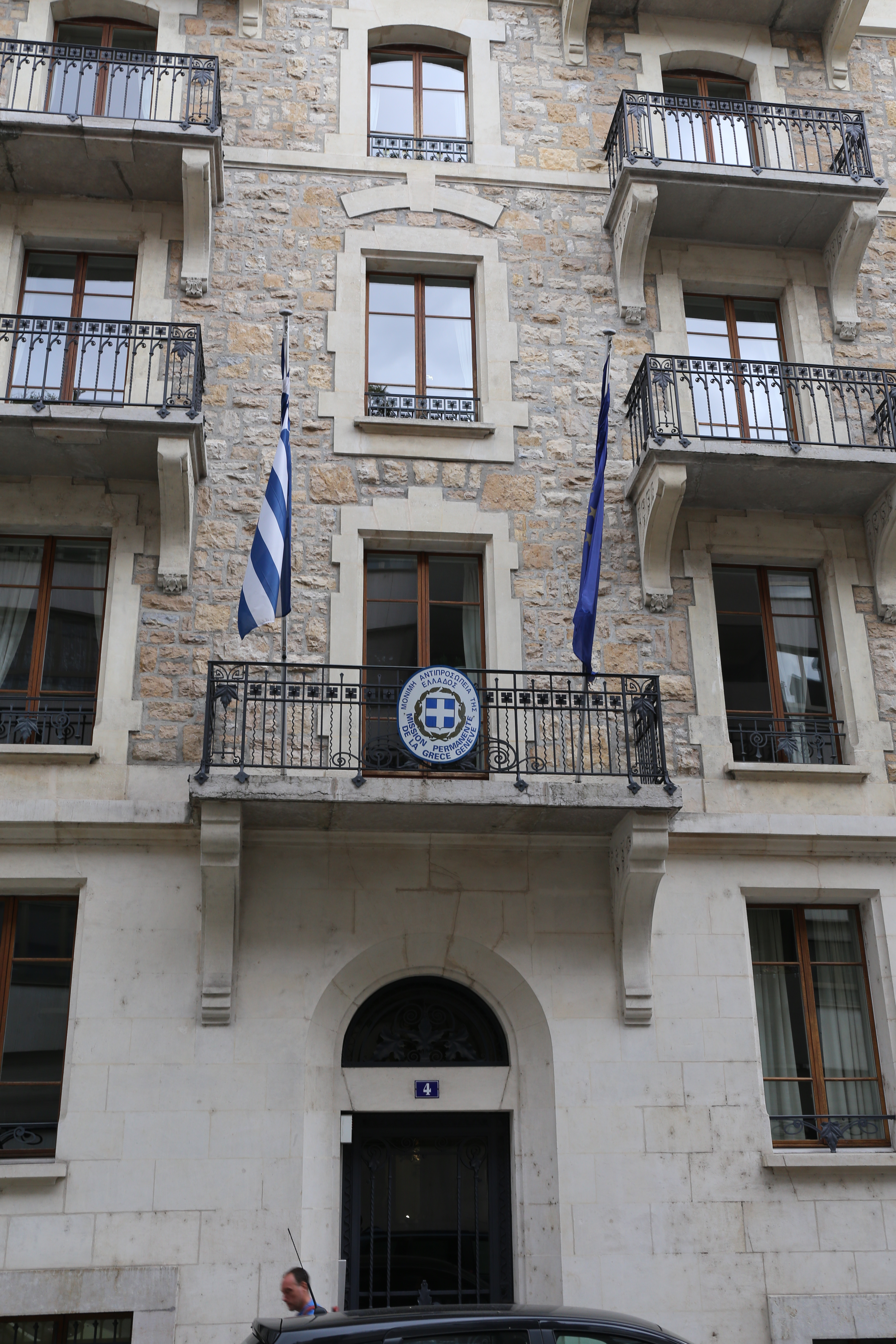
Permanent Mission to the United Nations in Geneva

== Closed missions ==
=== Africa ===
Host country	Host city	Mission	Year closed	Ref.
Cameroon	Yaoundé	Embassy (Note: Resident in Abuja, Nigeria)	2009	
Morocco	Casablanca	Consular office	2018	
South Africa	Durban	Consulate	2011	
Sudan	Khartoum	Embassy (Note: Resident in Cairo, Egypt)	2015	
Zaire (Note: The consulate general closed down prior to the renaming of the Republic of Zaire into the Democratic Republic of Congo in 1997.)	Lubumbashi	Consulate-General	1995	

=== Americas ===
Host country	Host city	Mission	Year closed	Ref.
Brazil	Rio de Janeiro	Consulate-General	Unknown	
United States	New Orleans	Consulate	Unknown	

=== Asia ===
Host country	Host city	Mission	Year closed	Ref.
Japan	Kobe	Consulate-General	1981	

=== Europe ===
Host country	Host city	Mission	Year closed	Ref.
Belarus	Minsk	Embassy (Note: Resident in Moscow, Russia)	2003	
Bulgaria	Plovdiv	Consulate-General	2016	
France	Marseille	Consulate-General	2016	
France	Nice	Consulate	2011	
Germany	Cologne	Consulate-General	2011	
Germany	Hannover	Consulate-General	2011	
Germany	Leipzig	Consulate-General	2011	
Italy	Milan	Consulate-General	Unknown	
Italy	Naples	Consulate-General	2011	
Italy	Venice	Consulate	Unknown	
Netherlands	Rotterdam	Consulate-General	Unknown	
Romania	Constanța	Consulate	Unknown	
Serbia	Niš	Consulate	2010	
Ukraine	Mariupol	Consulate-General	2022	

=== Oceania ===
Host country	Host city	Mission	Year closed	Ref.
New Zealand	Wellington	Embassy (Note: Resident in Canberra, Australian Capital Territory, Australia)	2015	

== See also ==
- Foreign relations of Greece
- List of diplomatic missions in Greece
- Visa policy of the Schengen Area
