= Greece–Vietnam relations =

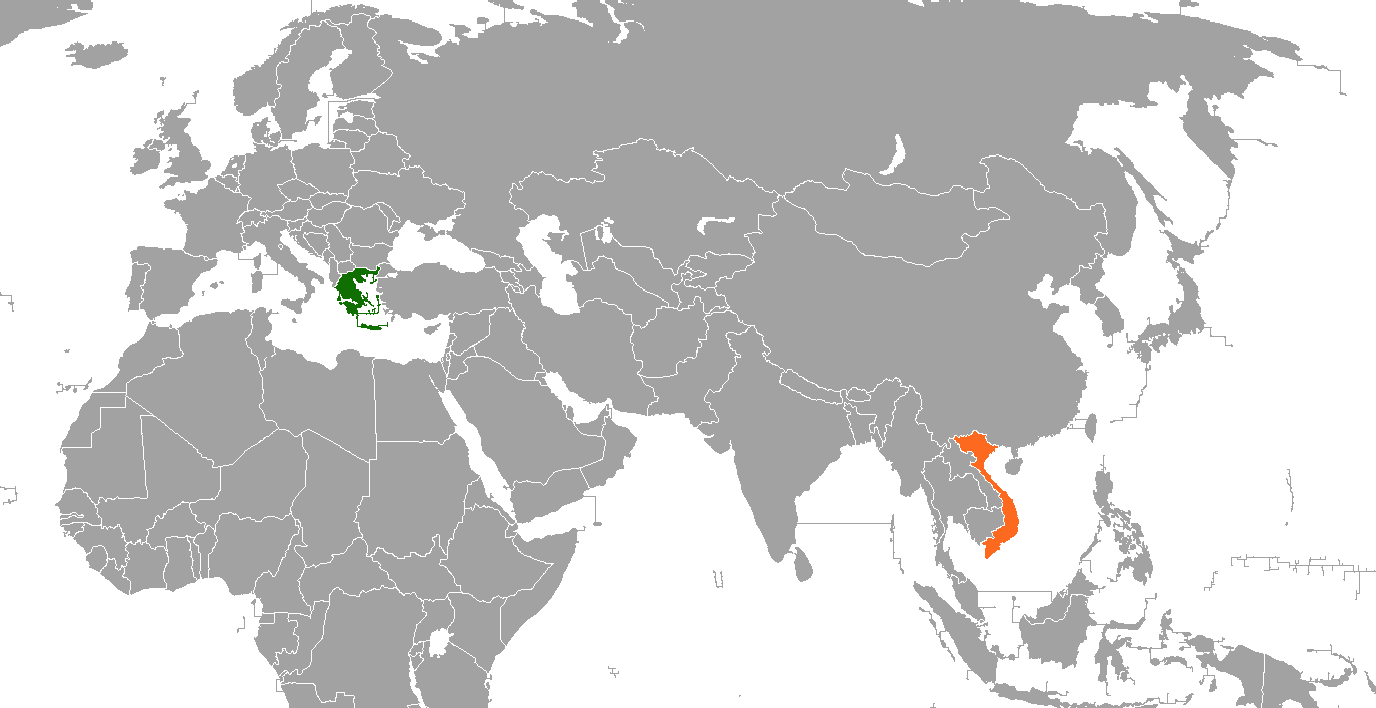
- Greece: Vietnam

Greece and Vietnam have bilateral relations. Greece hosts the Vietnamese embassy in Athens, and Vietnam hosts its Greek counterpart in Hanoi.

== History ==
While the two countries did not have many historical links in the past, the ancient Funan that occupied southern Vietnam and Cambodia did maintain trade with Greek merchants. Greeks viewed Funan as one of the most prosperous civilizations, and many of its gems were brought back to Greece in response. However, with the fall of Funan and the later rise of other ancient states (like Đại Việt, Champa, and the Khmer Empire) direct relationships with Greece disappeared.

Ancient Greek geographers describe the city of Cattigara, which some researchers associate with an archaeological site in present-day Vietnam.

Trade and commerce of oriental products (silk, brocade, spices, Edible bird's nest, pearls, exotic wood, etc...) from Vietnam only made it to Roman Empire (and later on the Greek dominated Byzantine Empire) through Silk Road and Indian Ocean trade routes, not by direct contact with Greeks.

With the Fall of Constantinople, it was not until the 20th century that the two countries established ties.

=== Indochina War ===
During the First Indochina War between the Vietnamese led by Việt Minh and France, a Greek who deserted from French Army, Kostas Sarantidis, sought destiny by fighting on the Vietnamese side against the French. He eventually adopted his Vietnamese name, "Nguyễn Văn Lập", and married a Vietnamese woman, became fluent on the Vietnamese language as well. Due to his efforts on liberating Vietnam from the French, he was rewarded "Friendship Order and Vietnamese nationality" in 2011. In 2013, he was named a Hero of the People's Armed Forces, he is the only foreigner who has taken this title. He was also awarded several other honorary titles by both the Vietnamese Party and State, including the Victory Medal, Third Class, and the Resistance War Medal, Second Class.

=== Vietnam War ===
While the Vietnam War was not Greece's priority, Greek Australians formed a part of the Australian Defence Force and fought against North Vietnam on the side of the South.

== Today ==
With Vietnam's Đổi Mới reforms, Greece and Vietnam established official relations, and it has been perceived as good to excellent. Vietnam has attached increasingly tie with the Greeks, particularly in recent years, with Greece supports Vietnam's FTA with European Union, in which Greece is a member. Diplomatic tie has also been increased as well.

During the COVID-19 pandemic, Greece donated 250,000 vaccines to Vietnam.

== See also ==
- Foreign relations of Greece
- Foreign relations of Vietnam
- Kostas Sarantidis
