= Foreign relations of Greece =

As one of the oldest Euro-Atlantic member states in the region of Southeast Europe, Greece enjoys a prominent geopolitical role as a middle power, due to its political and geographical proximity to Europe. Greece maintains strong relations with the United States, the United Kingdom, France, Italy, Cyprus and the rest of the European Union and NATO, Lebanon, the United Arab Emirates, North Macedonia, Albania, Australia, Armenia, Saudi Arabia, Serbia, Switzerland while at the same time focuses at improving further the good relations with the Arab World, Caucasus, China, India, South Korea, Japan, Mongolia, Vietnam, The Philippines, South Africa, and the rest of the African Union, Arab League, BRICS, CELAC and Nordic Council. As member of the European Union, the Union for the Mediterranean, and the Council of Europe, Greece is a key player in the eastern Mediterranean region and has encouraged the collaboration between neighbors, as well as promoting the Energy Triangle, for gas exports to Europe. Greece also has the largest economy in the Balkans, where it is an important regional investor.

Prominent issues in Hellenic foreign policy include the claims in the Aegean Sea and Eastern Mediterranean by Turkey and the Turkish occupation of Cyprus.

== Overview ==
Greece has diplomatic relations with almost all the countries in the world, as shown in the map below.

Representation through: embassy – Greek embassy in another country
general consulate – no representation – Greece

== Disputes ==
Following the resolution of the Macedonia naming dispute with North Macedonia due to the Prespa agreement in 2018, the Ministry identifies two remaining issues of particular importance to the Greek state: Turkish challenges to Greek sovereignty rights in the Aegean Sea and corresponding airspace and the Cyprus dispute involving the Turkish occupation of Northern Cyprus.

=== Cyprus dispute ===
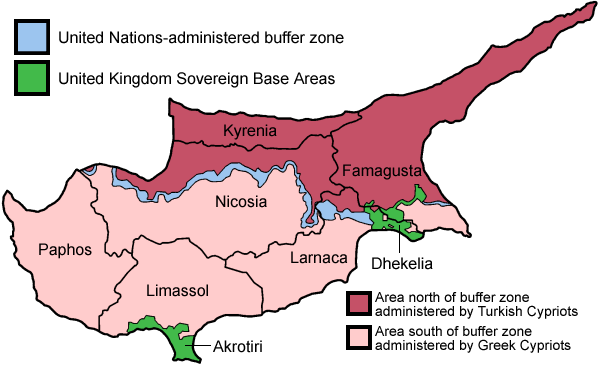
A map of divided Cyprus.

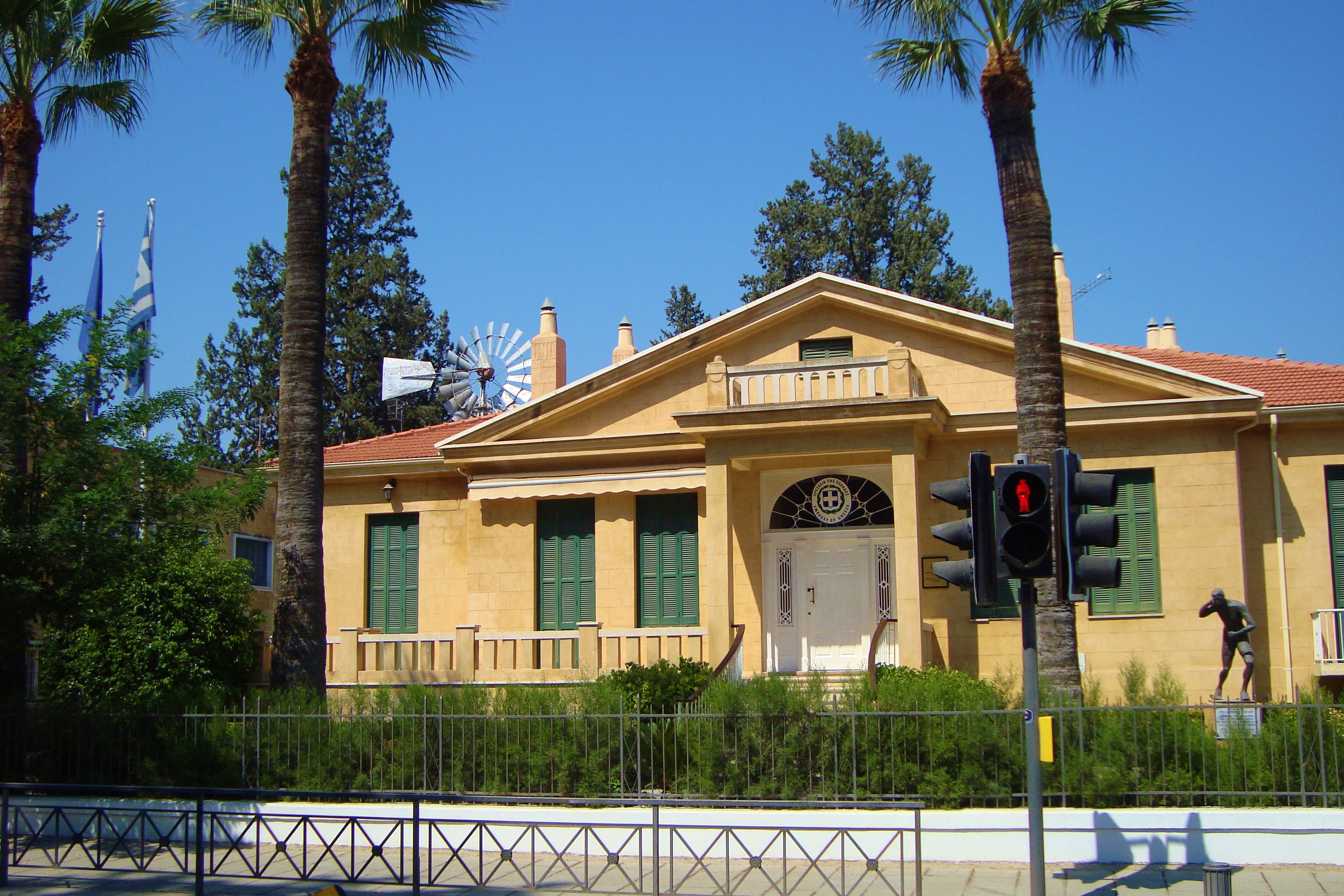
Embassy of Greece in Nicosia, Cyprus

As the island of Cyprus was heading towards independence from the United Kingdom the Greek (82%) and Turkish (18%) communities became embroiled in bitter inter-communal fighting, partly sponsored by the two "motherlands". EOKA-B and the Turkish Resistance Organization (TMT) were responsible for many atrocities which resulted in cementing tensions and led to total isolation of the communities with Turkish Cypriots withdrawn into enclaves.

In 1974, the US-backed Greek junta –took power during November 1973 by overthrowing the previous junta – partly in a move to draw attention away from internal turmoil and partly unsatisfied with Makarios' policy in Cyprus, on 15 July attempted a coup to replace him with Nikos Sampson and declare union with Greece. Seven days later, Turkey launched an invasion of Cyprus allegedly to reinstate the constitution but which resulted in blooded conflict, partition of the island and mass ethnic cleansing. The overwhelming Turkish land, naval and air superiority against island's weak defenses led to the bringing of 37% of the land under Turkish control.

170,000 Greek Cypriots were evicted from their homes in the north with 50,000 Turks following the opposite path concluding the de facto division of Cyprus. In 1983 Turkish Cypriots proclaimed independence unilaterally with only Turkey recognizing them. As of today the north is under an embargo as a measure against the illegal partition of the island.

Ever since both countries along with the two communities of the island are engages into a vicious cycle of negotiations which led to little. In 2004 the Annan Plan for Cyprus was put to vote but whilst it was accepted by the north, it was rejected by the Greek-Cypriots as it meant in their eyes, endorsing a confederal state with a weak central government and considerable local autonomy. The Republic of Cyprus is a constitutional democracy which has reached great levels of prosperity, with a booming economy and good infrastructures, part of the United Nations, European Union and several others organizations by whom it is recognized as the sole legitimate government of the whole island.

Greece calls for the removal of Turkish troops from Cyprus and the restoration of a unified state. The Republic of Cyprus is receiving strong support from Greece in international forums with the latter maintaining a military contingent on the island, and Greek officers filling key positions in the Cypriot National Guard.

=== Aegean claims by Turkey ===
Other issues dividing Greece and Turkey involve the delimitation of the continental shelf in the Aegean Sea, territorial waters and airspace. In March 1987 a dispute concerning oil drilling rights, almost led to war between the countries with Greece advocating the dispute to be decided by the International Court of Justice. In early 1988, the Turkish and Greek Prime Ministers met at Davos, Switzerland, and later in Brussels. They agreed on various measures to reduce bilateral tensions and to encourage cooperation.

Tensions over the Aegean Sea surfaced again in November 1994, when Greece claimed under the Law of the Sea Treaty, which Turkey has not signed, that it reserved the right to declare an expansion of its continental shelf from 6 to 12 nautical miles (11–22 km; 7–14 mi) around its Aegean islands. Turkey which has itself expanded its continental shelf in the Black Sea shore, stated that it would consider any such action a cause for war. New technical-level bilateral discussions began in 1994 but soon fizzled-out.

In January 1996, Greece and Turkey came close to an armed confrontation over the question of which country had sovereignty over an islet in the Aegean. In July 1997, on the sidelines of the North Atlantic Treaty Organization (NATO) summit in Madrid, Greek and Turkish leaders reached agreement on six principles to govern their bilateral relations. Within a few months, however, the two countries were again at odds over Aegean airspace and sovereignty issues. Tensions remained high for months, although various confidence-building measures were discussed to reduce the risk of military accidents or conflict in the Aegean, under the auspices of the NATO Secretary General.

=== Turkey and the EU ===
Greece has come out in support of Turkey's bid for European Union membership, and supports its full integration to the union when conditions for its acceptance are met. On 6 May 2004, Turkish Prime Minister Recep Tayyip Erdoğan became the first Turkish leader to visit Greece in fifty years. On 24 January 2008, Greece's premier Costas Karamanlis visited Turkey a full 48 years after the last Greek premier and uncle of his Constantine Karamanlis had visited the neighboring country.

=== Turkish government arson admission ===
On Monday 23 December 2011, in an interview on Turkish newspaper BirGün discussing secret budgets, former Turkish Prime Minister Mesut Yılmaz admitted that Turkish secret agents intentionally started forest fires in Greece between 1995 and 1997 during the Prime Ministership of Tansu Çiller as part of state-sponsored sabotage, resulting in huge damage caused by major forest fires on the islands of the eastern Aegean and in Macedonia. Mesut Yılmaz's admission sparked political outrage in Greece on Monday, causing Greece's Foreign Ministry spokesman Grigoris Delavekouras to say that the claims were "serious and must be investigated," adding that Athens was awaiting a briefing from Ankara. Conservative New Democracy's shadow foreign minister Panos Panayiotopoulos said the revelations "cast heavy shadows over Greek–Turkish relations" and called on Turkey recompense Greece for losses incurred.

Following an official complaint from Greece on 24 December seeking clarification over comments by former Prime Minister Mesut Yılmaz relating to forest fires in Greece in the mid-1990s, the Greek and Turkish foreign ministers, Stavros Dimas and Ahmet Davutoğlu, spoke on Wednesday 28 December. Dimas stressed how important it was that Ankara investigate the claims that in the past Turkey's intelligence services paid arsonists to set fire to forests in Greece. In addition to Greek Foreign Ministry meetings with Turkish officials, Greece's Supreme Court prosecutor Yiannis Tentes launched an emergency inquiry on 27 December, ordering the investigations into the mid-1990s wildfires blamed on arson to be reopened with regard to the initial claims reportedly made by Yılmaz.

Former head of Greek intelligence service Leonidas Vasilikopoulos said they had received information from their agents in Turkey that Turkish agents or others were involved in the forest fires on Greek islands. After making the comments in Turkish daily newspaper BirGün, Yilmaz said that his words had been distorted and that he was referring to Greek agents causing fires in Turkey. However, on Thursday 29, Turkish daily Milliyet published an article referring to a secret report that seemed to support claims made in the interview by Mesut Yılmaz that secret agents had caused forest fires in Greece in the 1990s. According to Milliyet, an associate of Yılmaz's, Kutlu Savas, compiled a 12-page report that detailed the actions of Turkish agents in Greece. It described how the National Intelligence Organization of Turkey (MIT) had formed two teams: one which carried out bombings at tourist sites on Crete and other parts of Greece and another which was responsible for starting the wildfires. An attack on an army camp in Lamia, central Greece, is also mentioned.

== Diplomatic relations ==
List of countries which Greece maintains diplomatic relations with:

| # | Country | Date |
|---|---|---|
| 1 | United Kingdom | 21 November 1828 |
| 2 | Sweden | 5 February 1833 |
| 3 | France | 19 February 1833 |
| 4 | Portugal | 22 July 1835 |
| 5 | Spain | 6 December 1835 |
| 6 | Russia | 5 September 1838 |
| 7 | Belgium | 11 December 1838 |
| 8 | Netherlands | 18 April 1856 |
| 9 | Italy | 12 May 1861 |
| 10 | Denmark | 11 November 1863 |
| 11 | United States | 16 June 1868 |
| 12 | Argentina | 29 November 1874 |
| 13 | Serbia | 18 January 1879 |
| 14 | Romania | 9 January 1880 |
| 15 | Bulgaria | 9 September 1880 |
| 16 | Japan | 1 June 1899 |
| 17 | Iran | 19 November 1902 |
| 18 | Brazil | 6 June 1911 |
| 19 | Switzerland | 8 October 1917 |
| 20 | Ethiopia | 25 November 1917 |
| 21 | Norway | 25 May 1918 |
| 22 | Finland | 1 March 1919 |
| 23 | Poland | 13 March 1919 |
| 24 | Uruguay | 19 April 1920 |
| 25 | Czech Republic | 25 May 1920 |
| 26 | Austria | 21 August 1920 |
| 27 | Chile | 20 October 1920 |
| 28 | Hungary | 2 December 1921 |
| 29 | Egypt | 15 April 1922 |
| 30 | Albania | 4 January 1923 |
| 31 | Turkey | 1 April 1925 |
| 32 | Saudi Arabia | 1926 |
| 33 | Cuba | 29 May 1930 |
| 34 | Luxembourg | 13 December 1933 |
| 35 | Mexico | 17 May 1938 |
| 36 | South Africa | 2 September 1941 |
| 37 | Colombia | 1 January 1942 |
| 38 | Canada | 5 November 1942 |
| 39 | Lebanon | 17 June 1947 |
| 40 | Syria | 24 June 1947 |
| 41 | Iraq | 27 November 1947 |
| 42 | Jordan | 1947 |
| 43 | Indonesia | 27 December 1949 |
| 44 | Philippines | 28 August 1950 |
| 45 | Germany | 12 July 1951 |
| 46 | Libya | 1952 |
| 47 | Australia | 30 March 1953 |
| 48 | New Zealand | 22 September 1955 |
| 49 | Sudan | 28 January 1956 |
| 50 | India | 14 May 1956 |
| 51 | Panama | 5 September 1956 |
| 52 | Dominican Republic | 16 October 1956 |
| 53 | Tunisia | 1956 |
| 54 | Sri Lanka | 19 March 1958 |
| 55 | Myanmar | 20 March 1958 |
| 56 | Thailand | 26 May 1958 |
| 57 | Iceland | 6 June 1958 |
| 58 | Morocco | 7 January 1959 |
| 59 | Malaysia | 16 November 1959 |
| 60 | Nepal | 2 February 1960 |
| 61 | Pakistan | 12 February 1960 |
| 62 | Cyprus | 16 August 1960 |
| 63 | South Korea | 5 April 1961 |
| 65 | Madagascar | 26 September 1961 |
| 64 | Kuwait | 3 January 1965 |
| 66 | Costa Rica | 2 July 1965 |
| 67 | Honduras | 2 July 1965 |
| 68 | Nicaragua | 2 July 1965 |
| 69 | Central African Republic | 10 September 1965 |
| 70 | Peru | 3 December 1965 |
| 71 | El Salvador | 1965 |
| 72 | Venezuela | 23 February 1966 |
| 73 | Algeria | 15 April 1966 |
| 74 | Malta | 30 April 1966 |
| 75 | Democratic Republic of the Congo | 15 June 1966 |
| 76 | Ecuador | 5 July 1966 |
| 77 | Guatemala | 20 July 1966 |
| 78 | Singapore | 21 October 1966 |
| 79 | Kenya | 8 December 1966 |
| 80 | Mongolia | 3 March 1967 |
| 81 | Republic of the Congo | 13 May 1968 |
| 82 | Burundi | 1968 |
| 83 | Malawi | 30 April 1970 |
| 84 | Ivory Coast | 17 December 1970 |
| 85 | Nigeria | 1970 |
| 86 | Uganda | 12 October 1971 |
| 87 | Tanzania | 29 November 1971 |
| 88 | Senegal | January 1972 |
| 89 | Paraguay | 28 February 1972 |
| 90 | Bangladesh | 11 March 1972 |
| 91 | China | 5 June 1972 |
| 92 | Mauritania | 3 October 1972 |
| 93 | Rwanda | 1 February 1973 |
| 94 | Cameroon | 28 April 1973 |
| 95 | Ghana | 31 July 1973 |
| 96 | Bahrain | 28 August 1973 |
| 97 | Oman | 1 October 1973 |
| 98 | Somalia | 15 December 1973 |
| 99 | Qatar | 1973 |
| 100 | Gabon | April 1974 |
| 101 | Liberia | 29 May 1974 |
| 102 | Ireland | 22 January 1975 |
| 103 | Vietnam | 15 April 1975 |
| 104 | Jamaica | 15 May 1975 |
| 105 | United Arab Emirates | 31 May 1975 |
| 106 | Chad | 13 September 1975 |
| 107 | Benin | 1975 |
| 108 | Cambodia | 1 August 1976 |
| 109 | Mozambique | 30 December 1976 |
| 110 | Mali | 1976 |
| 111 | Lesotho | 31 January 1977 |
| 112 | Papua New Guinea | January 1977 |
| 113 | Guinea | 1977 |
| 114 | Fiji | 24 February 1978 |
| 115 | Botswana | 10 April 1978 |
| 116 | Suriname | 1 December 1978 |
| 117 | Burkina Faso | 1978 |
| 118 | Zambia | 15 February 1979 |
| 119 | Guyana | 14 May 1979 |
| 120 | Sierra Leone | 15 May 1979 |
| 121 | Niger | June 1979 |
| — | Holy See | 17 July 1979 |
| 122 | Eswatini | 1979 |
| 123 | Togo | 1979 |
| 124 | Seychelles | 16 July 1980 |
| 125 | Zimbabwe | 13 August 1980 |
| 126 | Angola | 30 August 1980 |
| 127 | Trinidad and Tobago | 10 October 1980 |
| 128 | Yemen | 5 December 1980 |
| 129 | Saint Lucia | 18 November 1980 |
| 130 | Mauritius | 23 February 1981 |
| 131 | Samoa | 3 April 1981 |
| 132 | Grenada | 20 July 1982 |
| 133 | Maldives | 17 September 1983 |
| 134 | Vanuatu | 1 June 1984 |
| 135 | Nauru | 1 October 1984 |
| 136 | Kiribati | 1984 |
| 137 | Tuvalu | 1984 |
| 138 | Antigua and Barbuda | 10 June 1985 |
| 139 | Tonga | 5 July 1985 |
| 140 | Djibouti | 21 October 1985 |
| 141 | São Tomé and Príncipe | 24 April 1986 |
| 142 | Cape Verde | 26 April 1986 |
| 143 | Brunei | 6 May 1986 |
| 144 | Belize | 4 September 1986 |
| 145 | Barbados | 23 March 1987 |
| 146 | Solomon Islands | 28 August 1987 |
| 147 | Laos | 15 June 1989 |
| 148 | Israel | 21 May 1990 |
| 149 | Namibia | 9 August 1990 |
| 150 | Latvia | 2 September 1991 |
| 151 | Estonia | 2 October 1991 |
| 152 | Lithuania | 7 January 1992 |
| 153 | Ukraine | 15 January 1992 |
| 154 | Armenia | 20 January 1992 |
| 155 | Marshall Islands | 14 February 1992 |
| 156 | Belarus | 5 March 1992 |
| 157 | Moldova | 11 March 1992 |
| 158 | Uzbekistan | 16 March 1992 |
| 159 | Azerbaijan | 2 April 1992 |
| 160 | Georgia | 20 April 1992 |
| 161 | Turkmenistan | 10 June 1992 |
| 162 | Kyrgyzstan | 12 June 1992 |
| 163 | Croatia | 20 July 1992 |
| 164 | Slovenia | 21 July 1992 |
| 165 | Tajikistan | 30 September 1992 |
| 166 | Kazakhstan | 1 October 1992 |
| 167 | Slovakia | 1 January 1993 |
| 168 | Bahamas | May 1993 |
| 169 | Liechtenstein | 6 July 1994 |
| 170 | Andorra | 17 March 1995 |
| 171 | Eritrea | 9 June 1995 |
| 172 | North Macedonia | 13 October 1995 |
| 173 | Bosnia and Herzegovina | 30 November 1995 |
| 174 | Federated States of Micronesia | 30 April 1996 |
| 175 | Saint Vincent and the Grenadines | 13 August 1997 |
| 176 | San Marino | 22 November 1999 |
| 177 | North Korea | 8 March 2001 |
| 178 | Gambia | 25 July 2002 |
| 179 | Timor-Leste | 4 May 2003 |
| 180 | Palau | 2 June 2004 |
| 181 | Saint Kitts and Nevis | 9 July 2004 |
| 182 | Afghanistan | 2004 |
| 183 | Dominica | 15 November 2005 |
| 184 | Montenegro | 18 December 2006 |
| 185 | Monaco | 15 May 2008 |
| — | Cook Islands | 20 October 2018 |
| 186 | Equatorial Guinea | 13 February 2020 |
| — | Sovereign Military Order of Malta | 2 December 2021 |
| 187 | South Sudan | 20 March 2024 |
| 188 | Bolivia | Unknown |
| 189 | Comoros | Unknown |
| 190 | Guinea-Bissau | Unknown |
| 191 | Haiti | Unknown |

== Bilateral relations ==
=== Africa ===
Greece enjoys close historic relations with many members of the African Union, such as South Africa, Sudan, and Ethiopia.

| Country | Formal relations began | Notes |
|---|---|---|
| Algeria | 1962 | See Algeria–Greece relations: Relations between the two countries have been traditionally friendly since Algeria's first years of independence.; Greece maintains an embassy in Algiers; Algeria is represented in Greece by its embassy in Athens.; Both countries are members of the Union for the Mediterranean. |
| Botswana | 10 April 1978 | Greece is represented in Botswana through its embassy in Pretoria, South Africa, and Botswana is represented in Greece through its Permanent Representation to the United Nation Office in Geneva, Switzerland. |
| Democratic Republic of Congo | 15 June 1966 | See Democratic Republic of the Congo – Greece relations Both countries established diplomatic relations on 15 June 1966 when Ambassador of Democratic Republic of Congo to Greece M. Joseph Kahamba, presented his credentials to King Constantin.: Greece has an embassy in Kinshasa and two honorary consulates in Kisangani and Lubumbashi.; The Democratic Republic of the Congo has an embassy in Athens. Both countries are full members of Francophonie. |
| Egypt | 15 April 1922 | See Egypt–Greece relations Both countries share relations since the years BC with the creation of Alexandria by Alexander the Great. Egypt has had a sizable Greek community which is mostly centered around Alexandria, Egypt's second largest city and the seat of the Greek Orthodox Patriarchate of Alexandria. In the modern era, both countries enjoy very good and warm diplomatic relations since 1833 and especially after the Greek War of Independence, and both countries have signed several defense cooperation agreements, with the heads of states visiting each other in a regular basis.: Egypt is represented in Greece by its embassy in Athens and general consulate in Thessalonica.; Greece is represented in Egypt by its embassy in Cairo and general consulate in Alexandria.; Sizable communities of Greeks live in Egypt (Alexandria) and Egyptians in Greece (Patras, Athens).; Greece and Egypt signed bilateral agreements for trade, tourism and defense cooperations.; Both countries are members of the Union for the Mediterranean. |
| Eswatini | | Greece is accredited to Eswatini from its embassy in Pretoria, South Africa.; Eswatini is accredited to Greece from its embassy in London, UK. |
| Ethiopia | 25 November 1917 | See Ethiopia–Greece relations: Ethiopia is accredited to Greece from its embassy in Rome, Italy.; Greece has an embassy in Addis Ababa. |
| Kenya | 8 December 1966 | See Greece–Kenya relations Both countries established diplomatic relations on 8 December 1966 when accredited first ambassador of Greece to Kenya with residence in Nairobi Mr. George C. Papadopoulos.: Greece has an embassy in Nairobi.; Kenya is accredited to Greece from its embassy in Rome, Italy. |
| Lesotho | 31 January 1977 | Both countries established diplomatic relations on 31 January 1977: Greece is represented in Lesotho through its embassy in Pretoria, South Africa.; Lesotho is represented in Greece via parallel accreditation of its embassy in Rome, Italy. |
| Libya | 1952 | See Greece–Libya relations: Diplomatic relations between the two countries date back since 1952, when Libya's independence was formally recognized by the UN.; Relations between the two countries have been traditionally friendly.; Due to the Libyan Civil War, Greece has closed its embassy in Tripoli.; Libya is represented in Greece through its embassy in Athens.; A Greek Consulate General was reopened in Benghazi in April 2021. |
| Madagascar | 8 July 1967 | Greece is represented in Madagascar through its embassy in Nairobi, Kenya.; Madagascar is represented in Greece through its embassy in Rome, Italy. |
| Malawi | 30 April 1970 | Both countries established diplomatic relations on 30 April 1970.: Greece is represented in Malawi by its embassy in Harare, Zimbabwe.; Malawi is represented in Greece by its embassy in Brussels, Belgium. |
| Mauritius | 23 February 1981 | Both countries established diplomatic relations on 23 February 1981: Greece is represented in Mauritius through its embassy in Nairobi, Kenya.; Mauritius is represented in Greece through its embassy in Brussels, Belgium. |
| Morocco | 1960 | Bilateral relations between Greece and Morocco have traditionally been very good.; Greece has an embassy in Rabat, and a consular office in Casablanca.; Morocco is represented in Greece by its embassy to Athens.; Both countries are members of the Union for the Mediterranean and the Francophonie. |
| Namibia | 9 August 1990 | Both countries established diplomatic relations on 9 August 1990: Greece is represented in Namibia through its embassy in Nairobi, Kenya.; Namibia is represented in Greece through its embassy in London, England and an honorary consulate in Athens. |
| Nigeria | 1970 | See Greece–Nigeria relations Nigeria has an embassy in Athens. Greece established a diplomatic mission in Nigeria in 1970, and today has an embassy in Abuja and a consulate in Lagos. Trade between the two countries is imbalanced, with imports from Greece to Nigeria exceeding exports. Greek-owned tankers have an important role in shipping Nigerian oil and natural gas, its main exports. Recently a Greek tanker was involved a dispute over crude oil smuggling. Greek-controlled companies have invested US$5 billion in the Nigerian economy. There is a small Greek business community in Lagos. |
| Senegal | January 1972 | Both countries established diplomatic relations in January 1972: Greece has an embassy in Dakar.; Senegal is accredited to Greece from its embassy in Rome, Italy. |
| Seychelles | 16 July 1980 | Both countries established diplomatic relations on 16 July 1980: Greece is represented in Seychelles through its embassy in Nairobi, Kenya.; Seychelles is represented in Greece through its embassy in Paris, France. |
| South Africa | 2 September 1941 | See Greece–South Africa relations Both countries established diplomatic relations on 2 September 1941 when has been appointed first Greek Minister to South Africa Mr. Theologus Nicoloudis.: The presence of a large Greek Diaspora in South Africa led to the establishment of diplomatic relations as far back as the early 20th century.; Greece has an embassy in Pretoria, a general consulate in Johannesburg and 2 consulates in Cape Town and Durban.; South Africa has an embassy in Athens and a consulate-general in Thessaloniki.; Relations are cordial, and got stronger since World War II. |
| Sudan | 28 January 1956 | Both countries established diplomatic relations on 28 January 1956 when has been accredited Chargé d'Affaires of Legation of the Greece to Sudan Mr. P. Calogeras. Greece and Sudan have long enjoyed a very cordial and friendly relationship spanning decades. The two countries enjoy strong and productive relations in the areas of diplomacy, economic reciprocity, and also there are large concentrations of Sudanese (both students and immigrants) in Greece, and numerous Greek nationals who have resided in Sudan since the early 20th century. The two countries are on very good terms with each other, notwithstanding Sudan's close ties with Greece's historical rival, Turkey. Greece has an embassy in Khartoum, whilst Sudan is represented in Greece through the parallel accreditation of its embassy in Athens. The Hellenic country also deeply supports peaceful stability in Sudan's western region, Darfur. |
| Tunisia | 1956 | See Greece–Tunisia relations: Greece has an embassy in Tunis.; Tunisia has an embassy in Athens. |
| Zambia | 1977 | Greece is represented in Zambia by its embassy in Harare, Zimbabwe and an honorary consulate in Lusaka.; Zambia is represented in Greece by its embassy in London, United Kingdom. |
| Zimbabwe | 13 August 1980 | See Greece–Zimbabwe relations Both countries established diplomatic relations on 13 August 1980 Greece has an embassy in Harare. Due to the economic situation, Zimbabwe has neither an embassy nor an honorary consulate in Greece. |

=== The Americas ===
| Country | Formal relations began | Notes |
|---|---|---|
| Argentina | 14 October 1920 | see Argentina–Greece relations Both countries established diplomatic relations on 14 October 1920 when has been accredited first Envoy Extraordinary and Minister Plenipotentiary of Greece to Argentina (resident in Brazil) Mr. Stamati Ghiouzes Pezas. Both countries are represented by an embassy in the other one's capital. At least 30,000 persons of Greek descent live in Argentina with about 5,000 with Greek passports. The majority of Greeks live in Buenos Aires.: Argentina has an embassy in Athens.; Greece has an embassy in Buenos Aires. |
| Belize | 4 September 1986 | Both countries have established diplomatic relations on 4 September 1986.; Belize's embassy in Mexico has parallel accreditation for Greece. Belize has an honorary consulate in Athens since 1992.; Greece does not have any representation in Belize, its embassy in Mexico is also accredited to Belize. |
| Brazil | 1912 | See Greece–Brazil relations: In addition to its embassy in Brasília, Greece has two general consulates in (São Paulo and Rio de Janeiro) and four honorary consulates.; Brazil has an embassy in Athens. |
| Canada | 5 November 1942 | See Canada–Greece relations: The nations first exchanged ambassadors in 1942.; Both countries are members of the United Nations, the Human Security Network, the Organization for Security and Co-operation in Europe, and NATO.; Greece has an embassy in Ottawa, as well as a consulate-general in Montreal, Toronto, and Vancouver.; Canada has an embassy with a consular office in Athens and an honorary consulate in Thessaloniki. |
| Chile | 1 July 1941 | see Chile–Greece relations: Chile has an embassy in Athens.; Greece has an embassy in Santiago. |
| Colombia | 1 January 1942 | Colombia is represented in Greece through its embassy in Rome (Italy) and counts with an honorary consulate in Thessaloniki (Greece).; Greece is represented in Colombia through its embassy in Caracas (Venezuela) and counts with an honorary consulate in Bogotá (Colombia).; Greece is the 13th largest trade partner of Colombia in the European Union. |
| Cuba | 17 July 1946 | See Cuba–Greece relations: Cuba has an embassy in Athens.; Greece has an embassy in Havana. |
| Dominica | 15 November 2005 | Greece is represented in Dominica via parallel accreditation of its embassy in Caracas. Dominica has appointed an ambassador accredited to Greece, based in Roseau, Dominica. |
| Guyana | 14 May 1979 | Greece is represented in Guyana by its embassy in Caracas, Venezuela.; Greece has provided Guyana with development aid in the past. |
| Mexico | 17 May 1938 | See Greece–Mexico relations Both countries established diplomatic relations on 17 May 1938.: Greece has an embassy in Mexico City, along with honorary consulates in Mérida and Monterrey.; Mexico has an embassy in Athens and honorary consulates in Piraeus and Thessaloniki.; Greek immigration to Mexico; History of diplomatic relations between Mexico and Greece (Spanish only); Bilateral relations between Greece and Mexico (in English and Greek only) |
| Nicaragua | 2 July 1965 | see Greece–Nicaragua relations Greece–Nicaragua relations are foreign relations between Greece and Nicaragua. Greece is represented in Nicaragua through its embassy in Mexico City. Nicaragua is represented in Greece through its embassy in Rome. |
| Peru | 3 December 1965 | See Greece–Peru relations: Both countries established diplomatic relations on 3 December 1965; In 1992, Greece opened an embassy in Lima.; Peru has an embassy in Athens. |
| United States | 16 June 1868 | see Greece–United States relations Both countries established diplomatic relations on 16 June 1868 The United States and Greece have long-standing historical, political, and cultural ties based on the shared democratic values, history of Greek immigration to the States and participation as Allies during World War II, the Korean War, and the Cold War. Previously, the US helped the reconstruction of post-war Greece through the Marshall Plan and various other aids culminating at about $11.1 billion in economic and security assistance since 1946. The current mutual defense cooperation agreement (MDCA) provides for continued U.S. military assistance to Greece and the operation by the U.S. of a military facility at Souda Bay, Crete. About three million Americans are of Greek ancestry. Greek-Americans are an established, well-organized community in the U.S. (several notable politicians, including former Vice-president Spiro Agnew, and Senators Olympia Snowe and Paul Sarbanes are of Greek ancestry), and they help cultivate close political and cultural ties with Greece. Greece has the seventh-largest population of U.S. Social Security beneficiaries in the world. |
| Uruguay | 1928 | See Greece–Uruguay relations Both countries established diplomatic relations in 1928.: Greece has an embassy in Montevideo.; Uruguay has an embassy in Athens. |
| Venezuela | 23 February 1966 | See Greece–Venezuela relations: Greece has an embassy in Caracas.; Venezuela has an embassy in Athens. |

=== Asia ===
Greece has a special interest in Middle East and North Africa because of its geographic position and its economic and historic ties to the area. The country cooperated with allied forces during the 1990–1991 Gulf War. Since 1994, Greece has signed defense cooperation agreements with Israel and Egypt and in recent years, Greek leaders have made numerous trips to the region to strengthen bilateral ties and encourage the Middle East Peace Process. In July 1997, December 1997, and July 1998 Greece hosted meetings of Israeli and Palestinian politicians to contribute to the peace process. Greece also maintains diplomatic relations with the General Palestinian Delegation while enjoying cordial relations with Syria.

| Country | Formal relations began | Notes Greece-Afghanistan relations |
|---|---|---|
| Afghanistan | | See Afghanistan–Greece relations: Diplomatic relations were established in 2004.; Afghanistan has an embassy in Athens.; Greece is represented in Afghanistan through its embassy in Islamabad, Pakistan. |
| Armenia | 20 January 1992 | see Armenia–Greece relations Both countries established diplomatic relations on 20 January 1992 Greece was one of the first countries to recognize Armenia's independence on 21 September 1991 and one of those that have officially recognized the Armenian genocide. Since the independence of Armenia the two countries have been partners within the framework of international organizations (United Nations, OSCE, Council of Europe, BSEC), whilst Greece firmly supports the community programs aimed at further developing relations between the EU and Armenia. Continuous visits of the highest level have shown that both countries want to continue to improve the levels of friendship and cooperation (Visit by the President of Armenia Levon Ter-Petrossian to Greece in 1996, visit by the President of the Hellenic Republic Costis Stephanopoulos in 1999, visit by the President of Armenia Robert Kocharyan to Greece in 2000 and 2005 and visit by Greek president Karolos Papoulias to Armenia in June 2007). Greece is, after Russia, the major military partner of Armenia. Armenian officers are trained in Greek military academies, and various technical assistance is supplied by Greece. Since 2003, an Armenian platoon has been deployed in Kosovo as part of KFOR, where they operate as a part of the Greek battalion of KFOR.: Armenia has an embassy in Athens.; Greece has an embassy in Yerevan.; Greece has recognized the Armenian genocide in 1996. |
| Azerbaijan | 2 April 1992 | see Azerbaijan–Greece relations Both countries established diplomatic relations on 2 April 1992 Azerbaijan-Greece relations today are friendly. Each state maintains a full embassy, Azerbaijan in Athens and Greece in Baku. Recently in February 2009, Azerbaijani President Ilham Aliyev visited Greece to boost bilateral relations. The leader met with Greek President Karolos Papoulias, as well as the Greek Prime Minister Costas Karamanlis. At the meeting between the officials, the two nations agreed that they must work more closely to get Azeri gas into Greece to help ease recent security issues. In the past the two nations have made many deals related to the oil industry. In 2007 Greek Development Minister Dimitris Sioufas signed a "memorandum of cooperation" in the sectors of natural gas and oil while in Baku. Sioufas referred to this memorandum as a "new page in economic and energy relations of the two countries." Greece supports Azerbaijan's bid to join to European Union and is the first EU member that wanted directly gas important from Azerbaijan. Both countries are also full members of the Council of Europe, the Organization for Security and Co-operation in Europe (OSCE) and the Organization of the Black Sea Economic Cooperation (BSEC). |
| Bahrain | 28 August 1973 | Both countries established diplomatic relations on 28 August 1973: Bahrain does not have any representation in Greece.; Greece has an honorary consulates in Manama. |
| Cambodia | 8 April 1996 | The Cambodian embassy in Belgium is also accredited to Greece; The Greek embassy in Bangkok (Thailand) is also accredited to Cambodia.; Both countries are full members of the Francophonie. |
| China | 5 June 1972 | see China–Greece relations Both countries established diplomatic relations on 5 June 1972: China has an embassy in Athens.; Greece has an embassy in Beijing. |
| Georgia | 20 April 1992 | See Georgia–Greece relations Both countries established diplomatic relations on 20 April 1992: Georgia has an embassy in Athens.; Greece has an embassy in Tbilisi. |
| India | 14 May 1956 | see Greece-India relations Both countries established diplomatic relations on 14 May 1956: Greece has an embassy in New Delhi.; India has an embassy in Athens. |
| Indonesia | 27 December 1949 | see Greece-Indonesia relations: Both countries established diplomatic relations on 27 December 1949; Indonesia has an embassy in Athens which was opened in 1994.; Greece has an embassy in Jakarta which was opened in 1997.; Greek Foreign Affairs Ministry about relations with Indonesia. |
| Iran | 19 November 1902 | See Greece–Iran relations Both countries established diplomatic relations on 19 November 1902 when has been appointed first Persian Ambassador to Greece. Cartoon on the establishment of diplomatic relations between Greece and the then-ruling Qajar dynasty of Persia in 1902: Relations between the two people date back from the antiquity and before Persian invasion of Greece. There is also the report of Strabo of an Athenian delegation to Persia in 432 BC. The relations have evolved from sworn rivalry during the Greco-Persian wars to strong cordiality. Alexander the Great defeated the Persian empire and the country was put under Greek rule for approx. 70 years until they were defeated by Parthians (another group of Iranian people) and pushed backed from Persia to their homeland.; Greece has an embassy in Tehran; Iran is represented by its embassy in Athens. |
| Iraq | 27 November 1947 | see Greece-Iraq relations, Greece–Kurdistan Region relations Both countries established diplomatic relations on 27 November 1947 when has been accredited Chargé d'Affaires of Greece to Iraq (resident in Beirut) Mr. Nadji Vassiliou. Relations of the Greek and Iraqi peoples are deeply rooted in history, both have developed cultures that have influenced the course of humanity. They date as far back as when Alexander the Great ruled Mesopotamia (which name is of Greek origin, meaning "land between rivers") and eventually died in Babylon, Iraq. Greece firmly and consistently supports the independence, sovereignty and territorial integrity of Iraq. Greece traditionally maintained good and friendly relations with Iraq due to strong historical and cultural bonds, dating back to ancient times.: Greece has an embassy in Baghdad.; Iraq has an embassy in Athens. |
| Israel | 21 May 1990 | see Greece–Israel relations Both countries established diplomatic relations on 21 May 1990.: Since 1990, diplomatic relations between the two countries were upgraded from diplomatic pepresentation to embassy-level.; Greece is represented in Israel through its embassy in Tel Aviv, its consulate general in Jerusalem, and an honorary consulate in Haifa.; Israel is represented in Greece through its embassy in Athens. |
| Japan | 1 June 1899 | see Greece–Japan relations Both countries established diplomatic relations on 1 June 1899.: There has been a Greek embassy in Tokyo since 1960; The Japanese Embassy in Athens opened in 1960, when it was decided to upgrade the Japanese Consulate which had opened in 1956 and has also an honorary consulate in Thessaloniki.; Since then the two countries have enjoyed excellent relations in all fields, and cooperate closely. |
| Kazakhstan | 1 October 1992 | See Greece–Kazakhstan relations Both countries established diplomatic relations on 1 October 1992.: Greece opened an embassy in Almaty in February 1997.; Kazakhstan opened an embassy in Athens in 2005. Kazakhstan has an honorary consulate in Athens since 1998.; Kazakh President Nursultan Nazarbayev visited Greece in July 2001 and Greek President Konstantinos Stephanopoulos visited Kazakhstan in June 2002. The Kazakh leader also attended the 2004 Summer Olympics opening ceremony. |
| Kyrgyzstan | 12 June 1992 | see Greece-Kyrgyzstan relations: Both countries established diplomatic relations in 1992. Greece is represented in Kyrgyzstan through its embassy in Almaty (Kazakhstan). Kyrgyzstan is represented in Greece through a non-resident ambassador based in Bishkek (in the Foreign Ministry). Kyrgyz consular representation in Greece is made by the Kazakh consulate in Athens.; On 1 November 2004, Kyrgyz President Askar Akayev made an official visit to Greece. A Foreign Ministry delegation from Greece visited Dushanbe for talks, and had meetings with Tajikistan's Foreign Minister Zarifi and First Deputy Foreign Minister Youldashev in 2008. Foreign Minister Dora Bakoyannis met with Tajikistan's Foreign Minister Zarifi during the 1st EU-Central Asia Forum on security issues in Paris in September 2008.; There are between 650 and 700 people of Greek descent living in Kyrgyzstan. However, the data of the General Secretariat For Greeks Abroad give an even lower number (50 people).; In 2004 Greece and Kyrgyzstan signed a bilateral agreement for air transports, tourism and diplomacy during Kyrgyz president Askar Akayev's visit to Greece. |
| Lebanon | 17 June 1947 | see Greece–Lebanon relations Both countries established diplomatic relations on 17 June 1947, when first Minister of Greece to Lebanon with residence in Cairo M. Georges Triantaphyllidis presented his credentials The relation between both people dates back to early antiquity, with the early trading activities between the ancient Greeks and the Phoenicians. In modern times, Greek-Lebanese bilateral relations are very good at all levels. Both countries are members of the Union for the Mediterranean and the Francophonie.: Greece has an embassy in Beirut.; Lebanon has an embassy in Athens. |
| Malaysia | 16 November 1959 | see Greece–Malaysia relations Both countries established diplomatic relations on 16 November 1959.: The Greek embassy in Jakarta, Indonesia, is also accredited to Malaysia. There is an Honorary Greek Consulate in Kuala Lumpur.; In the opposite way, the Malaysian embassy in Berlin is at the same time accredited to Greece. There is a Malaysian honorary consulate in Athens.; The former Yang di-Pertuan Agong (the head of state of Malaysia) and current Raja of Perlis, Tuanku Syed Sirajuddin visited Greece in August 2004 to attend the Athens Olympics.; Greece exports specialised machinery, non-ferrous metals, tobacco, metal goods, medical products, minerals and fruit, and imports industrial equipment, oil, footwear, paper, rubber, vehicles and telecommunications equipment from Malaysia. |
| Maldives | 17 September 1983 | Both countries established diplomatic relations on 17 September 1983.; Greece is represented in Sri Lanka by its embassy in New Delhi, India.; Maldives have an honorary consulate in Athens. |
| Mongolia | 3 March 1967 | Both countries established diplomatic relations on 3 March 1967.: Greece is represented in Mongolia through its embassy in Beijing (China).; Mongolia is represented in Greece through its embassy in Sofia (Bulgaria) and an honorary consulate in Athens.; Mongolian Ministry of Foreign Affairs: list of bilateral treaties with Greece (in Mongolian only) |
| Myanmar | 20 March 1958 | Both countries established diplomatic relations on 20 March 1958.: Greece is represented in Burma through its embassy in Bangkok (Thailand).; Greek interests in Burma are represented by the Italian embassy in Yangon.; Burma is represented in Greece through its embassy in Rome (Italy). |
| North Korea | 8 March 2001 | |
| Oman | 1 October 1973 | Both countries established diplomatic relations on 1 October 1973 |
| Pakistan | | See Greece–Pakistan relations In modern times, Pakistan's first embassy in Athens was opened in 1975. Greece established an embassy in Islamabad in 1987. There are around 32,500 Pakistani people living and working in Greece. However, Islamabad has stated it will not accept Greek sovereignty over Cyprus and it should withdraw its bulk of armed forces from the southern part of the island to restore the independence of the Cypriots, which it continues to have diplomatic relations with Nicosia. |
| Palestine | | See Greece–Palestine relations: Diplomatic relations were founded with the PLO in 1981.; Palestine has a representative office in Athens and Greece's consulate general in Jerusalem is accredited to Palestine.; In December 2015, the Hellenic parliament voted unanimously in the presence of President Mahmoud Abbas to recommend to the government the full recognition of the state of Palestine on 4 June 1967 borders with East Jerusalem as its capital. |
| Philippines | 28 August 1950 | See Greece–Philippines relations: There is a Philippine embassy in Athens.; Greece has an embassy in Manila and an honorary consulate general.; There are around 40,000 Filipinos living and working in Greece, making them one of the largest foreign communities in Greece. (see Filipinos in Greece). |
| Qatar | 1973 | see Greece–Qatar relations: Greece has an embassy in Doha which opened in 2007.; Qatar has an embassy in Athens which opened in 2008. |
| Saudi Arabia | 1961 | See Greece–Saudi Arabia relations: Greece has an embassy in Riyadh. Greece has also a consulate general in Jeddah.; Saudi Arabia has an embassy in Athens.; See also Greeks in Saudi Arabia |
| Singapore | 21 October 1966 | Both countries established diplomatic relations on 21 October 1966.: The Greek embassy in Bangkok, Thailand, is also accredited to Singapore.; Singapore's embassy in Berlin, Germany, is also accredited to Greece. Singapore has an honorary consulate in Athens.; In consular affairs Greek interests are represented by the French Embassy in Singapore. There is also a special Port Consular Office in Singapore, which looks after the interests of Greek shipping companies, as well as an honorary consulate. |
| South Korea | 5 April 1961 | See Greece–South Korea relations Both countries established diplomatic relations on 5 April 1961: Greece and South Korea have good relations.; Greece sent an expeditionary force as part of the United Nations Command to help the South Koreans (ROK) against the North Koreans (DPRK) during the Korean War.; Greek embassy in Seoul.; Korean embassy in Athens. |
| Sri Lanka | 1957 | Both countries established diplomatic relations in 1957; Greece is represented in Sri Lanka by its embassy in New Delhi, India.; Sri Lanka is represented in Greece by its embassy in Rome, Italy. |
| Syria | 24 June 1947 | See Greece–Syria relations Both countries established diplomatic relations on 24 June 1947 when has been accredited Envoy Extraordinary and minister Plenipotentiary of Greece to Syria with residence in Cairo Mr. Georges Triandafyllides.: Greece has an embassy in Damascus and three honorary consulates (in Latakia, Tartus and Aleppo).; Syria has an embassy in Athens.; Both countries are charter members of the Union of the Mediterranean.; On 8 May 2020, the Greek Foreign Ministry Nikos Dendias announced a restoration of relations between Greece and Syria and assigned former ambassador to Syria and Russia, Tasia Athanassiou, as a Special Envoy of Greece's Foreign Ministry for Syria. |
| Thailand | 26 May 1958 | Both countries established diplomatic relations on 26 May 1958: The Greek Embassy in Bangkok was opened in November 1989.; Thailand has an embassy in Athens.; Greek Ministry of Foreign Affairs about relations with Thailand; Thai embassy in Athens; Thai deputy premier, UN sec. gen. candidate, meets with premier Karamanlis |
| Turkey | 24 August 1833 | see above, and see Greece–Turkey relations Both countries established diplomatic relations on 24 August 1833 when has been appointed first Ambassador of Greece to Turkey Konstantinos Zografos.He presented his credentials on 30 July 1834. After more than a century of strained relations and intermittent fighting, Greece and Turkey agreed under the Treaty of Lausanne (1923) to a population exchange as an attempt to reduce tensions between the two countries in the future. A significant 300,000 strong Greek community in Istanbul and a 100,000 Turk one in Western Thrace were excluded from the transfer, with each one supposed to be working as counter-weights to any anti-minority policy that either Turkey or Greece may sought to apply in the future, however that counter-weight came to an end before the Cyprus dispute because of the Varlik Vergisi and Istanbul pogrom. In 1942 a wealth tax called the Varlık Vergisi was imposed on non-Muslims including Greeks, this resulted in financial ruin for many Greeks and another exodus of Greeks from Anatolia once World War II had come to an end. Again in 1955 an anti-Greek Istanbul pogrom was initiated by Turkish mobs against the Greek community of Istanbul, which led to the final gradual extinction of the Greek community in Anatolia. These two events were a major factor when the Cyprus problem surfaced as Greece and Turkey nearly came to a full-out war after Turkey's invasion of Cyprus. Similar disputes occurred for the islands of Imbros and Tenedos. Up to late 1990s strained relations almost led to an open war in 1974, 1987 and 1996. Since the earthquake diplomacy in 1999 relations have once again begun improving.: Greece has an embassy in Ankara and a consulates-general in Istanbul and İzmir and consulate in Edirne.; Turkey has an embassy in Athens and consulates-general in Piraeus, Rhodes and Thessaloniki.; Both countries are full members of the Council of Europe and of NATO.; Greece opposes Turkey's EU membership. |
| United Arab Emirates | 1971 | See Greece–United Arab Emirates relations: Greece opened an embassy in Abu Dhabi in 1989. Greece also has a commercial section in Dubai.; United Arab Emirates has an embassy in Athens.; In November 2020, Greece and the United Arab Emirates signed a foreign policy and defence agreement, as both shared mutual tensions with Turkey. |
| Vietnam | 15 April 1975 | See Greece–Vietnam relations Both countries established diplomatic relations on 15 April 1975.: Since May 2007, Greece has had an embassy in Hanoi, it was inaugurated by prime minister Kostas Karamanlis.; Vietnam has an embassy in Athens.; Bilateral trade has grown under the EU–Vietnam Free Trade Agreement (EVFTA, in force since 2020), reaching approximately $587 million in 2025 (up 16.4%), with Vietnamese exports predominant. |

=== Europe ===
| Country | Formal relations began | Notes |
|---|---|---|
| Albania | 1912, 1971 | see Albania–Greece relations Greece and Albania – even though diplomatic relations were restored in 1971 – normalized relations only in 1987 as until then both countries were officially – in a cease-fire – but nevertheless under the state of war since Albania and Italy had declared war on Greece on 28 October 1940. During rule of dictator Enver Hoxha relations were strained because of the part that Albania played during World War II against Greece and also because of the material help that they provided to Greek communists during the Greek civil war. In addition there was controversy about the treatment of the Greek minority in southern Albania, the historic region of Northern Epirus and the Cham issue. Following the collapse of communism in Albania, relations between the two countries improved with periods of destabilisation due to accusations of mistreatments of minorities in each country. Illegal immigration from Albania and complaints of the Greek minority in Albania regarding treatment by state authorities led to issues at the socio-political level. Greece, which didn't experience high levels of immigration at the time, faced increased criminality by illegal immigrants and ethnic Albanians faced police brutality. According to official Greek data, 450,000 Albanians, including Greeks from Albania, migrated to Greece. The number almost doubles if illegal migrants are included. Despite shared cultural relations as two neighbours, the influx of immigrants to Greece, and Albanian immigration for the first time since the end of the isolationist communist regime led to some tensions. Today, relations between the two countries are very close and are regarded as excellent, and, at the Albanian Government's request, about 250 Greek military personnel are stationed in Albania to assist with the training and restructuring the Albanian Armed Forces. Albania's economy is overdependent to the money immigrants from Greece sent back home, while Greece is the second larger trading partner, with more than US$400 million worth of investments. Moreover, Greek products account for 21% of Albania's imports, with Greece absorbing 12% of its neighboring country's exports. At the same time, low cost labor from Albania propelled the growth of the Greek economy, especially in the construction and agriculture sectors. Albania is home to an approximate 200,000 Greek community. while between 400,000 and 600,000 Albanians live and work in Greece, the vast majority of them post-1991 economic migrants. There are also 189,000 Albanian nations in Greece recognised as part of the Greek minority of Albania. Albanians in Greece form the largest ethnic and foreign community, and many are now naturalised Greek citizens. Albanians have also generally integrated well and some have assimilated completely in Greek society. As a result of interaction, integration and subsequent mass migration to Greece by other ethnic groups, the position of Albanians in the country has improved.: Albania is home to a considerable Greek community, both migrants and indigenous minority – number varies from 300 to 500,000 with 650,000 in total including North Epirus Greeks in Greece, USA and Australia.; Greece is home to just under a million Albanians (some sources say 600,000, whilst other Greek organisations claim 900,000 with illegal migrants and overstayers).; In addition to the Albanian immigrants, there are the Arvanites, a population group that today self-identifies as Greek who have traditionally spoken an Albanian dialect (Arvanitika). Arvanitika is today an endangered language, as its speakers have been shifting to the use of Greek and most younger members of the community no longer speak it.; Greece is Albania's most important European Union ally and partner.; Relations since the election victory of Edi Rama in 2013 have seen massive improvement and warming of relations between the two nations.; The Archbishop of Albania is Greek; There are many cultural, political, historical and biological similarities and shared kinship between the Albanian and Greek peoples.; Greek is the second most spoken language in Albania, with a considerable size having knowledge of it.; Albanian is the most common foreign/migrant language in Greece, although most Greeks do not have clear knowledge of it.; Many organisations both political and societal exist in Albania and Greece promoting relations between the two nations.; Albania is home to the largest number of Greek diaspora political and cultural organisations; there are 5 political parties and over a dozen organisations.; As of 2014 both nations have described their relations as 'excellent' and Albania considered Greece one of its 'strongest and most important allies', both NATO nations have close relations nowadays.; Greece continues to support Albania’s EU accession path as a strategic priority while linking progress to concrete improvements in the rule of law and the rights of the ethnic Greek minority (including property rights and state cadaster operations). High-level meetings in 2025-2026 (including Foreign Ministers Gerapetritis and Spiropali) reaffirmed this conditionality alongside cooperation on trade, energy, connectivity and cross-border issues. Albania’s economy remains closely linked to Greek investment and remittances; military training cooperation continues. |
| Austria | 25 August 1834 | See Austria–Greece relations Both countries established diplomatic relations on 25 August 1834 when Anton Prokesch von Osten had been appointed as the first Ambassador of Austria to Greece. Both countries have had diplomatic relations since the 19th century, after Greece's independence. Greece has an embassy in Vienna and an honorary consulate in Salzburg. Austria has an embassy in Athens and six honorary consulates (in Heraklion, Hermoupolis, Korfu, Patras, Rhodes and Thessaloniki). Both countries are full members of the European Union. There is also a Greek community living in Austria. |
| Belarus | 5 March 1992 | Both countries established diplomatic relations on 5 March 1992.: Belarus is represented in Greece through its embassy in Sofia (Bulgaria).; Until 2003, Greece had an embassy in Minsk, today it is represented through its embassy in Moscow (Russia). |
| Belgium | 30 November 1838 | See Belgium–Greece relations Both countries established diplomatic relations on 30 November 1838 when has been accredited Chargé d'Affaires of Belgium to Greece M. Benjamin Mary.: Belgium has an embassy in Athens and seven honorary consulates in Corfu, Iraklion, Mytilini, Patras, Piraeus, Rhodes and Thessaloniki.; Since 1945, Greece has an embassy in Brussels.; Both countries are full members of NATO, of the European Union.; There are between 15,000 and 26,000 Greeks who live in Belgium. |
| Bosnia and Herzegovina | 30 November 1995 | Both countries established diplomatic relations on 30 November 1995: Greece recognized Bosnia and Herzegovina's independence in 1992.; Since 1998, Bosnia and Herzegovina has an embassy in Athens.; Since 1996, Greece has an embassy in Sarajevo.; Greece provided 80.4% of the funding for the reconstruction of the Greece–Bosnia and Herzegovina Friendship Building. The building houses the Council of Ministers of Bosnia and Herzegovina.; Both countries are full members of the Union for the Mediterranean, of the Southeast European Cooperation Process, of the Southeast European Cooperative Initiative, of the Organization for Security and Co-operation in Europe and of the Council of Europe. |
| Bulgaria | 1908 | See Bulgaria–Greece relations Since the Second World War, relations between Greece and Bulgaria have been flourishing, and as the Greek President Konstantinos Tsatsos said during the Bulgarian leader Todor Zhivkov's visit to Athens in April 1976, "the old controversies have been forgotten and the hatchet buried forever". Greece became a firm supporter of Bulgaria's European Union membership and was the fifth EU member state and the first old member state to ratify the Accession Treaty. Since Bulgaria joined NATO in May 2004, Greek-Bulgarian relations have been developing on all fronts, and the Greek Ministry of Foreign Affairs describes relations between Greece and Bulgaria as "excellent".: Bulgaria has an embassy in Athens.; Greece has an embassy in Sofia.; Both countries are full members of the European Union and NATO. |
| Croatia | 20 July 1992 | see Croatia–Greece relations Both countries established diplomatic relations on 20 July 1992.: Croatia has an embassy in Athens.; Greece has an embassy in Zagreb.; Both countries are full members of the European Union and NATO. |
| Cyprus | 2 November 1960 | see Cyprus–Greece relations: Greece and Cyprus enjoy a special relationship. Relations are excellent, due to the shared national, historical and cultural heritage of both countries and common interests.; Cyprus has an embassy in Athens and a consulate-general in Thessaloniki.; Greece has an embassy in Nicosia.; Both countries are full members of the Council of Europe, of the Organisation for Economic Co-operation and Development and of the European Union. |
| Czech Republic | 25 May 1920 | see Czech Republic–Greece relations Both countries established diplomatic relations on 20 May 1920.: Diplomatic relations between Greece and former Czechoslovakia were established in 1920 – after Czechoslovakia's foundation. * The Czech Republic and Greece established diplomatic relations on 1 January 1993.; Each country has an embassy in the other one capital.; See also Greeks in the Czech Republic; Both countries are full members of the European Union and NATO. |
| Denmark | 8 November 1918 | see Denmark–Greece relations Both countries established diplomatic relations on 8 November 1918 when has been accredited first Envoy Extraordinary and Minister Plenipotentiary of Greece to Denmark Mr. S. A. Argyropoulo.: Denmark has an embassy in Athens.; Greece has an embassy in Copenhagen.; Both countries are full members of the European Union and NATO. |
| Estonia | 2 October 1991 | See Estonia–Greece relations: Estonia has an embassy in Athens.; Greece has an embassy in Tallinn.; Both countries are full members of the European Union and NATO. |
| Finland | 5 January 1918 | See Finland–Greece relations: Finland has an embassy in Athens.; Greece has an embassy in Helsinki.; Both countries are full members of the European Union and NATO. |
| France | 7 February 1833 | see France–Greece relations Both countries established diplomatic relations on 7 February 1833 when Michael Soutzos has been appointed as the first Ambassador of Greece in France.: Greece and France enjoy a special relationship. Relations are excellent, due to the shared cultural and historical bonds between the two countries and common interests.; The two countries share membership of the European Union and NATO and maintain embassy-level relations since 1833 (only three years after the Greek independence).; They were allies during both World Wars, Korean War and have never been adversaries of each other.; See also Greeks in France |
| Germany | 12 July 1951 | See Germany–Greece relations: Germany has an embassy in Athens.; Greece has an embassy in Berlin.; Both countries are full members of the European Union and NATO. |
| Holy See | 17 July 1979 | see Greece–Holy See relations: The Holy See immediately set up its Apostolic Nunciature to Greece in Athens in 1980.; The Greek ambassador to the Holy See resided at first in Paris, where he was concurrently accredited to France; but in 1988 a separate Greek embassy to the Holy See, situated in Rome, was set up. |
| Hungary | 23 July 1956 | See Greece–Hungary relations: Ambassadorial representation started on 24 August 1964.; Both countries are members of the European Union and NATO.; See also Greeks in Hungary |
| Iceland | 6 June 1958 | see Greece–Iceland relations: Greece is represented in Iceland through its embassy in Oslo (Norway) and through an honorary consulate in Reykjavík.; Iceland is represented in Greece through its embassy in Oslo (Norway) and through an honorary consulate in Athens.; Both countries are full members of the Council of Europe and NATO. |
| Ireland | 22 January 1975 | see Greece–Ireland relations: Greece has an embassy in Dublin.; Ireland has an embassy in Athens.; Both countries are full members of the Council of Europe, of the Organisation for Economic Co-operation and Development and of the European Union. |
| Italy | 12 May 1861 | see Greece–Italy relations: Greece and Italy have a special relationship. Relations are excellent, due to the shared cultural and historical heritage of both countries and common interests in the region.; Greece has an embassy in Rome, two general consulates in Milan and Naples, a consulate in Venice, and eleven honorary consulates in Trieste (General), Turin (General), Ancona, Catania, Livorno, Bari, Bologna, Brindisi, Florence, Palermo, Perugia, and a Port Consulate in Genoa.; Italy has an embassy in Athens, and fifteen honorary consulates in Alexandroupoli, Kefalonia, Chania, Chios, Corfu, Corinth, Ioannina, Heraklion, Kavala, Larissa, Patras, Rhodes, Thessaloniki, Santorini, and Volos.; Both countries are full members of the Council of Europe, of the Organisation for Economic Co-operation and Development and of the European Union and NATO.; There are around 180,000 Greek Orthodox or people of Greek descent living in Italy, of which the majority lives in southern Italy and Sicily.; An approximation of 200,000 Roman Catholic Italians or people of Italian descent are living in Greece with the majority of them in the Ionian Islands, western Greece and the capital Athens. |
| Latvia | 23 May 1922 | See Greece–Latvia relations: Greece recognized the State of Latvia on 23 May 1922, and diplomatic relations between the two countries were restored on 2 September 1991. Greece has never officially recognized the annexation of the Baltic states by the USSR.; The Latvian embassy in Athens was established in 1998. Latvia also has two honorary consuls in Greece (one in Athens and one in Thessaloniki).; The Greek embassy in Riga was opened in January 2005.; Both countries are members of the European Union and NATO. |
| Lithuania | 7 January 1922 | See Greece–Lithuania relations: Full diplomatic relations were re-established on 7 January 1992.; Lithuania has maintained an embassy in Athens since 1997 along with an honorary consulate in Thessaloniki.; Greece has had an embassy in Vilnius since 2 January 2005.; Both countries are members of the European Union and NATO.; The ambassador to Greece has been Artūras Žurauskas since 2006.; The ambassador to the Republic of Lithuania is Konstantinos Katsabis. |
| Luxembourg | | See Greece—Luxembourg relations: Greece has an embassy in Luxembourg.; Luxembourg has an embassy in Athens and three honorary consulates in Athens, Patras and Thessaloniki.; Both countries are full members of the European Union and NATO. |
| Malta | 30 April 1966 | See Greece–Malta relations Both countries established diplomatic relations on 30 April 1966.: The two countries share membership of the European Union.; Since 2004, Greece has an embassy in Valletta and accredited its first ambassador to Malta. Before that date the Greek embassy in Rome was accredited for Malta.; Malta has an embassy in Athens. |
| Montenegro | 18 December 2006 | See Greece–Montenegro relations Both countries established diplomatic relations on 18 December 2006: Greece recognized the Republic of Montenegro 13 June 2006.; Greece has an embassy in Podgorica.; Both countries are full members of the Council of Europe and NATO.; Greece is an EU member and Montenegro is an EU candidate. |
| Moldova | 27 March 1992 | see Greece–Moldova relations: Diplomatic relations between Greece and Moldova were established 27 March 1992.; Greece is represented in Moldova through its honorary consulate in Chișinău and its embassy in Kyiv.; Moldova is represented in Greece through its embassy in Athens, opened in 2003. |
| Netherlands | 1874 | see Greece–Netherlands relations: Greece has an embassy in The Hague.; the Netherlands has an embassy in Athens.; Both nations are members of the European Union, NATO and of the Council of Europe. |
| North Macedonia | 13 September 1995 | See Greece–North Macedonia relations See also: Macedonia naming dispute: Greece imposed a trade embargo on North Macedonia between 1994 and 1995.; Formal relations between the two countries began when Greece recognized the then Republic of Macedonia as the former Yugoslav Republic of Macedonia (FYROM) on 13 September 1995.; Greece is represented in the Republic of North Macedonia through its embassy in Skopje and its consulate general in Bitola.; The Republic of North Macedonia is represented in Greece through its embassy in Athens and its consulate general in Thessaloniki.; The two countries were involved in a naming dispute (see above until the Prespa Agreement was signed in 2018 and ratified by both countries in 2019).; Greece fully supports North Macedonia's candidacy for membership in the EU. |
| Norway | 25 May 1918 | see Greece–Norway relations: Greece has an embassy in Oslo (since 1980) and an honorary consulate in Bergen.; Norway has an embassy in Athens, and six honorary consulates in Piraeus, Patras, Corfu, Crete, Rhodes and Thessaloniki.; Both countries are members of Council of Europe and NATO. |
| Poland | 13 March 1919 | see Greece–Poland relations: Both countries established diplomatic relations on 13 March 1919; Greece has an embassy in Warsaw.; Poland has an embassy in Athens.; Today both countries are members of the European Union and NATO. |
| Portugal | 13 June 1837 | See Greece–Portugal relations Both countries established diplomatic relations on 13 June 1837 when Greek Ambassador in Madrid Andreas Metaxas is also appointed Ambassador in Portugal.: Greece has an embassy in Lisbon.; Portugal has an embassy in Athens.; Today both country are members of the European Union and NATO. Greece is pushing for Portugal to be admitted in the Mediterranean Games. |
| Romania | 9 January 1880 | see Greece–Romania relations Diplomatic relations were established on 9 January 1880 at the legation level and were raised to embassy-level on 1 January 1939. There has been a Greek presence in Romania for at least 27 centuries.: Both countries are full members of the Council of Europe, of the European Union and NATO. |
| Russia | 5 September 1838 | see Greece–Russia relations Diplomatic relations were established in 1828. Greece has an embassy in Moscow, and two general consulates (Saint Petersburg and Novorossiysk). Russia has an embassy in Athens, a general consulate in Thessaloniki and in 2012 announced to open honorary consulate in Alexandroupolis. Greece also opened another consulate general in Yekaterinburg. Both countries are full members of the Council of Europe and the Organization for Security and Co-operation in Europe. Despite historical sentiments of cultural and religious affinity between the two peoples, the countries′ official relationship has largely been adverse. Russia and Greece share stance on the Kosovo Declaration of Independence. Relations deteriorated drastically in the summer of 2018. In July 2023, The face of devastating wildfires, a former Greek defense minister urged the government to seek help from Russia, specifically requesting assistance from the Russian Be-200 amphibious aircraft, which has proven effective in extinguishing flames during previous Greek fire seasons. Thousands of tourists, including 10,000 Britons, were evacuated from Greece and its islands, while Rhodes and Corfu experienced large-scale evacuations due to the fires. |
| Serbia | 18 January 1879 | see Greece–Serbia relations Both countries established diplomatic relations on 18 January 1879. The two nations are traditionally, historically, religiously and culturally close and their friendly relations are confirmed by a regular political dialogue. Greece is supporting quick implementation of the Stabilisation and Association Agreement (SAA) between the EU and Serbia and easing visa regime EU towards Serbia. Greece is among the states that have not recognized the Kosovo Unilateral Declaration of Independence. Greece recognizes Kosovo as a part of Serbia. Greece is one of the most important economic investors in Serbia, mainly in financial, telecommunication, energy and construction sector. Greece will participate in financing construction of the Corridor 10 highway in Serbia with 100 mil. EUR in total which is a part of its Hellenic Plan for the Economic Reconstruction of the Balkans.: Greece is an EU member and Serbia is an EU candidate. |
| Slovakia | 1 January 1993 | Both countries established diplomatic relations on 1 January 1993.: Greece opened its embassy in Bratislava in September 1996.; Slovakia also has an embassy in Athens.; Both countries are full members of the European Union and NATO. |
| Slovenia | 21 July 1992 | Both countries established diplomatic relations on 21 July 1992.: Greece opened its embassy in Ljubljana in 1995.; Slovenia also has an embassy in Athens.; Both countries are full members of the European Union and NATO. |
| Spain | 3 August 1834 | See Greece–Spain relations Both countries established diplomatic relations on 3 August 1834.: There is embassy-level representation in Athens and Madrid.; Greece also has a general consulate in Barcelona, and Spain an honorary consulate in Thessaloniki.; Today both country are members of the European Union and NATO.; Both Queen Sophia of Spain and Domenikos Theotokopoulos are of Greek descent. |
| Sweden | 24 January 1833 | See Greece–Sweden relations Both countries established diplomatic relations on 24 January 1833 when Carl Peter von Heidenstam (until then Consul General) has been appointed as Chargé d'Affaires of the Kingdom of Sweden and Norway in Greece.: The first contact between the two countries can be traced back to the 11th century.; Both countries are members of the European Union and NATO.; Sweden has an embassy in Athens.; Greece has an embassies in Stockholm and maintains two Honorary General Consulates in Sweden, in the cities of Malmö and Gothenburg.; Sweden has eight honorary consulate in Greece (Thessaloniki, Rhodes, Piraeus, Patras, Kos, Corfu, Heraklion, Chania). |
| Switzerland | 8 October 1917 | See Greece–Switzerland relations Both countries established diplomatic relations on 8 October 1917 when has been accredited first Envoy Extraordinary and Minister Plenipotentiary of Greece to Switzerland Mr. Ap. Alexandris.: Greece has an embassy in Bern and a consulate-general in Geneva.; Switzerland has an embassy in Athens.; Both countries are full members of the Council of Europe. |
| Ukraine | 15 January 1992 | See Greece–Ukraine relations Both countries established diplomatic relations on 15 January 1992: Following the setting up of the Greek Embassy in Kyiv in 1993, general-consulates were set up in Mariupol and Odesa.; Ukraine has opened an embassy in Athens and a consulate-general in Thessaloniki.; See also Greeks in Ukraine |
| United Kingdom | 1834 | see Greece–United Kingdom relations Greece established diplomatic relations with the United Kingdom in 1834.: Greece maintains an embassy in London, and honorary consulates in Belfast, Birmingham, Edinburgh, Gibraltar, Glasgow, and Leeds.; The United Kingdom is accredited to Greece through its embassy in Athens, and vice consulates in Corfu, Crete, Rhodes, Thessaloniki, and Zakynthos.; The UK governed Ionian Islands from 1815 to 1864, when they were transferred to Greece. Both countries share common membership of the Council of Europe, European Court of Human Rights, the International Criminal Court, NATO, OECD, OSCE, and the World Trade Organization. Bilaterally the two countries have a Defence and Security Agreement, a Double Taxation Agreement, and a Strategic Bilateral Framework. |

=== Australia and Oceania ===
| Country | Formal relations began | Notes |
|---|---|---|
| Australia | 30 March 1953 | See Australia–Greece relations Relations between the two states are close: both country were allies during both World Wars, there are a large Greek community in Australia (dating back from the 1950s and 1960s). Both countries have an embassy in the each other's capital. Greece also has consulates general in Sydney, Melbourne and Adelaide, as well as a consulate in Perth, honorary consulates general in Brisbane and Darwin, and honorary consulates in Newcastle and Hobart. |
| Fiji | 24 February 1978 | Diplomatic relations were established on 24 February 1978; Fiji is represented in Greece through its embassy in Brussels, Belgium.; Greece is represented in Fiji through its embassy in Wellington, New Zealand and an honorary consulate in Suva. |
| New Zealand | 22 September 1955 | see Greece–New Zealand relations In 1999, Greece opened an embassy in Wellington; however, it has since closed and Greece is accredited to New Zealand from its embassy in Canberra, Australia. There is a Greek Honorary Consulate in Auckland. As part of an effort to redeploy resources in Europe, New Zealand closed its embassy in Athens in 1991, since when it has been represented in Greece through its embassy in Rome, Italy which is accredited accordingly. It does still retain an honorary consulate general in Athens. On the level of political cooperation, the two countries have a like-minded approach to international crises and current issues of international interest. There is particularly close cooperation in offering mutual support within international organizations, such as the Human Rights Commission, the Universal Postal Union, etc. New Zealand also supported Greece's candidacy for a seat on the UN Security Council. The prevailing climate in political relations between Greece and New Zealand was demonstrated in 2002 by the visit of the President of the Hellenic Republic to Wellington, which confirmed the excellent state of relations between the two countries. |
| Solomon Islands | 28 August 1987 | Both countries established diplomatic relations on 28 August 1987; Greece is represented in the Solomon Islands via parallel accreditation of its embassy in Canberra, Australia. |
| Tonga | 5 July 1985 | Diplomatic relations were established on 5 July 1985; Greece is represented in Tonga through its embassy in Wellington, New Zealand. |

== Terms ==
=== North Macedonia ===
Greece rejected the use of the term Macedonia or "Republic of Macedonia" to refer to its northern neighbour after its independence from the former Yugoslavia in 1991. The Greek government opposed the use of the name without any qualification such as 'Republic of Northern Macedonia' to the post-1991 constitutional name of its northern neighbour, citing historical and territorial concerns resulting from the ambiguity between the terms Republic of Macedonia, the Greek region of Macedonia and the ancient kingdom of Macedon, which falls within Greek Macedonia.

Greece also objected to the use of the terms "Macedonian" to denote ethnic Macedonians and the Macedonian language, as these terms have a different meaning in Greece (inhabitants of the Greek region of Macedonia and the Macedonian dialect of Greek). The dispute has escalated to the highest level of international mediation, involving numerous attempts to achieve a resolution, notably by the United Nations.

The provisional reference the former Yugoslav Republic of Macedonia (FYROM) was used in relations involving states which do not recognise the constitutional name, Republic of Macedonia. Nevertheless, all the United Nations member-states have agreed to accept any final agreement resulting from negotiations between the two countries. The dispute has not prevented the two countries from enjoying close trade links and investment levels (especially from Greece), but it has generated a great deal of political and academic debate on both sides.

On 13 September 1995 the two countries signed the Interim Accord, whereby Greece recognized the Republic of Macedonia under its provisional reference. As of August 2011 negotiations aimed at resolving the dispute are ongoing. Under Greek pressure, the European Union and NATO agreed that for the Republic of Macedonia to receive an invitation to join these institutions the name dispute must be resolved first. This resulted in a case at the International Court of Justice against Greece for violation of the Interim Accord. The Court deemed Greece was wrong to block its neighbour's bid to join NATO. No penalties were imposed but the result made it politically more difficult for Greece to object to any of its neighbour's future applications to either NATO or the EU.

On 12 June 2018 the Prespes agreement was signed between the two countries which changed the constitutional name of "Macedonia" to Republic of North Macedonia. Opposition arose in both countries but in the end the agreement was mutually ratified. The Prespes agreement went into force 12 February 2019. Greece officially endorsed North Macedonia's accession to NATO on 15 February 2019, being the first country in the defense alliance to do so.

=== Northern Epirus ===
Northern Epirus is the name used generally by Greeks to refer to the southern part of Albania, home to a Greek minority which after 1989 keeps reducing due to immigration to Greece. The Greek minority was subject to oppression and harassment during Enver Hoxha's communist rule and along with the rest of Albanians was hit hardly by the isolation that the regime imposed and from the economic hardship that followed the fall of communism as well. The treatment of the minority by the Albanian government is strongly linked with the status of Greco-Albanian relations.

The Greek minority is organized under the Unity for Human Rights Party which is the continuation of the former banned party called "Omonoia" (Unity in Greek) and has since 1997 joined the Socialist coalition. At the 1996 Albanian election the Greek minority party received 4.1% of the vote and two seats in parliament. The party leader is Vangjel Dule, while party member Vasilis Bolanos is former mayor of the town of Himara. The party is represented in the ELDR group in the Council of Europe. Strong Greek presence exists in Gjirokastër, Korçë, Sarandë, Himara and the nearby areas. The former CIA director George J. Tenet, Pyrros Dimas, Sotiris Ninis and former Greek president Kostis Stefanopoulos have ancestral links to the Greek minority.

The situation of the Greeks in Albania is closely tied to the socio-political ties of the two countries. At times differences between Athens and Tirana regarding the rights and position of the minority has led to tense relations. The community, alongside the Albanian communities in Greece are hailed as a bridge of friendship between the two countries.

=== Ecumenical Patriarchate of Constantinople ===
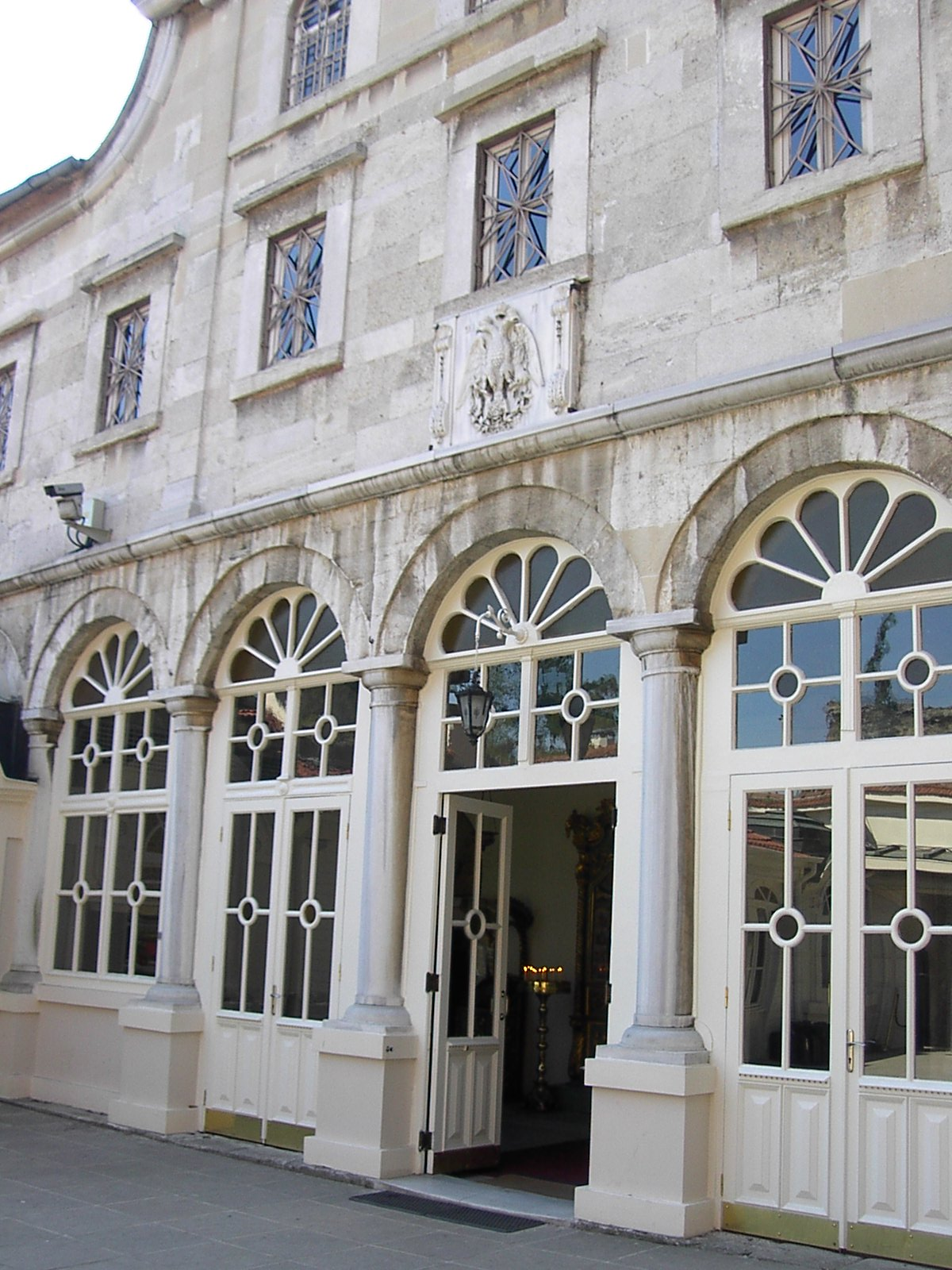
The entrance of the Patriarchal Cathedral of St. George in the Phanar district.

The Ecumenical Patriarchate of Constantinople, protected under the treaty of Lausanne is a point of controversy between Greece and Turkey as the latter refuses to recognize the Ecumenical character of the Patriarchate thus requiring the Patriarch himself to be a Turkish citizen. Moreover, the biggest part of the Patriarchate's property – known as Vakoufia – had been confiscated by Turkish authorities and the Theological school of Halki, the traditional school out of which the Eastern Orthodox Church draws its clergy, has been closed since 1971. To no avail numerous Greek, European Union and USA officials have criticized Turkey's attitude and even president Bill Clinton during his visit in Greece asked for the theological school to open. During Greek prime-minister's Kostas Karamanlis historic visit to Turkey in 2007, Recep Tayyip Erdoğan promised to reconsider his country's stance on the matter.

=== Black Sea ===
The Black Sea is a region heavily colonized by Greeks throughout history. It used to have a significant presence of Greeks up until the population exchange between Greece and Turkey in 1923. Nowadays there remains Greek presence on the shores of Black Sea mainly in Mariupol (Ukraine), Crimea, Russia and Georgia despite emigration to Greece during and after the dissolution of Soviet Union. Today Greeks in the region are estimated to be around 215,000 according to official Greek diaspora figures. Greece is a founding member of the Organization of the Black Sea Economic Cooperation.

== International organization participation ==
Greece is a major participant in most large-scale international bodies, with the geographic significance of the region proving advantageous for diplomatic, trade and political crossroads.

In 1967, Denmark, Norway, Sweden, and the Netherlands brought the Greek Case against the Greek junta regime for human rights violations. As a result, Greece left the Council of Europe in 1969, returning in 1976. It was the only country to have left the Council of Europe up until 2022 when Russia also left.

BIS, BSEC, CCC, CE, EAPC, EBRD, ECA (associate), ECE, ECLAC, EIB, EMU, EU, FAO, IAEA, IBRD, ICAO, IDA, IEA, IFAD, IFC, ILO, IMF, International Maritime Organization, Interpol, IOC, IOM, ISO, NATO, OECD, OSCE, UN, UN Security Council, UNCTAD, UNESCO, UNHCR, WEU, WHO, WIPO, Craiova Group WMO.

Greece was elected by the United Nations General Assembly to the United Nations Security Council, on 15 October 2004, as a non-permanent member for 2005 and 2006.

== See also ==
- List of diplomatic missions in Greece
- List of diplomatic missions of Greece
- List of ministries of Greece
- Foreign relations of the European Union
