= Greece–South Africa relations =

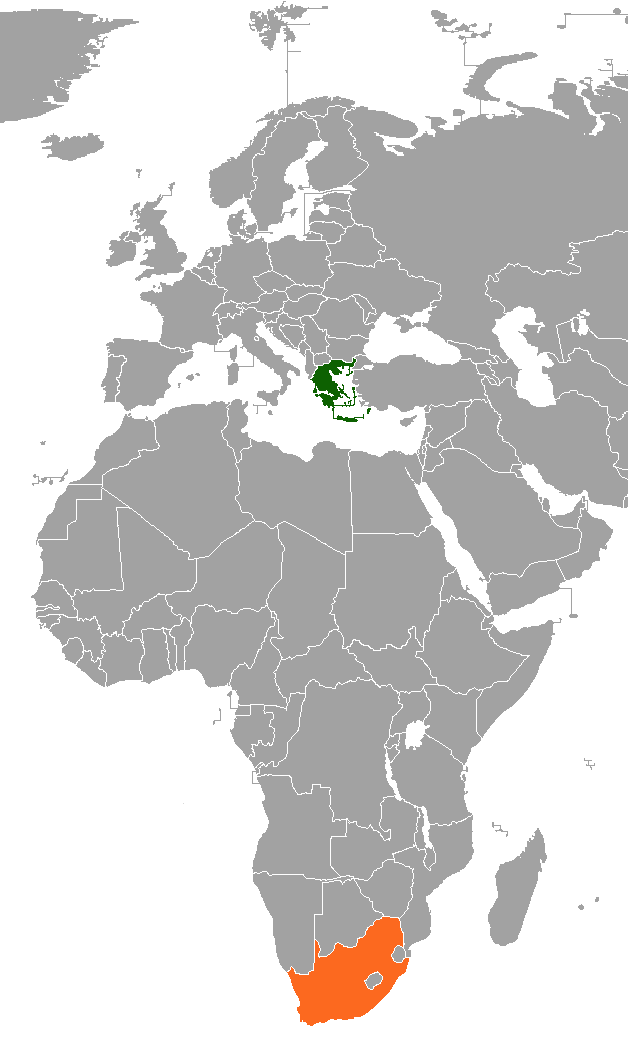
- Greece: South Africa

The presence of a large Greek diaspora in South Africa led to the establishment of diplomatic relations as far back as the early 20th century. Relations are cordial and became stronger since World War II, during which both countries were allies. Greece has an embassy in Pretoria, a general consulate in Johannesburg and two consulates in Cape Town and Durban. South Africa has an embassy in Athens and an honorary consulate in Thessaloniki.

== List of recent bilateral visits ==
- Former President of South Africa, Nelson Mandela to Greece (June 18 to 26, 2002)
- Greek Foreign Minister, George Papandreou (September 1 to 4, 2002) to South Africa to take part in the World Summit on Sustainable Development (WSSD)
- Former President of Greece, Mr. Konstantinos Stephanopoulos (October 29 to November 2, 2002)
- Foreign Minister of South Africa, Mrs. Nkosazana Dlamini-Zuma came to Greece (June 20 to 23, 2003) for bilateral discussions during the Greek Presidency of the EU.
- President of South Africa, Mr. Thabo Mbeki to Greece (February 24 to 26, 2005).

== List of bilateral agreements ==
- Convention on the avoidance of double taxation of income. Signed on November 19, 1998, put in force on February 19, 2003.
- Agreement on the promotion and mutual protection of investments. Signed on November 19, 1998, put in force on September 5, 2001.
- Agreement of air transports. Signed on November 19, 1998, put in force on May 23, 2001
- Agreement on collaboration in the sector of tourism. Signed on November 19, 1998
- Agreement on the commercial shipping and relevant shipping subjects. Signed on February 26, 1998, put in force on July 13, 2001.
- Agreement of cultural cooperation. Signed on July 25, 2005

== See also ==
- Foreign relations of Greece
- Foreign relations of South Africa
- Greeks in South Africa
