= Greece–United Arab Emirates relations =

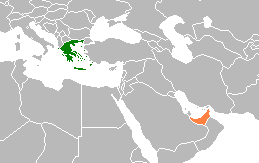

- Greece: United Arab Emirates

Greece–United Arab Emirates relations are foreign relations between Greece and the United Arab Emirates. Greece established diplomatic relations with the United Arab Emirates in the first years of the state's independence, and opened an embassy in Abu Dhabi in 1989. Greece also has a commercial section in Dubai. The United Arab Emirates is represented in Greece by its embassy in Athens.

In November 2020, Greece and the United Arab Emirates signed a foreign policy and defense agreement, as both shared mutual tensions with Turkey.

In May 2022, Greece and the United Arab Emirates together agreed to fund investments worth 4 billion euros ($4.2 billion) in the Mediterranean country. They would also explore further cooperation in the energy sector.

== See also ==
- Foreign relations of Greece
- Foreign relations of the United Arab Emirates
