= Greece–South Korea relations =

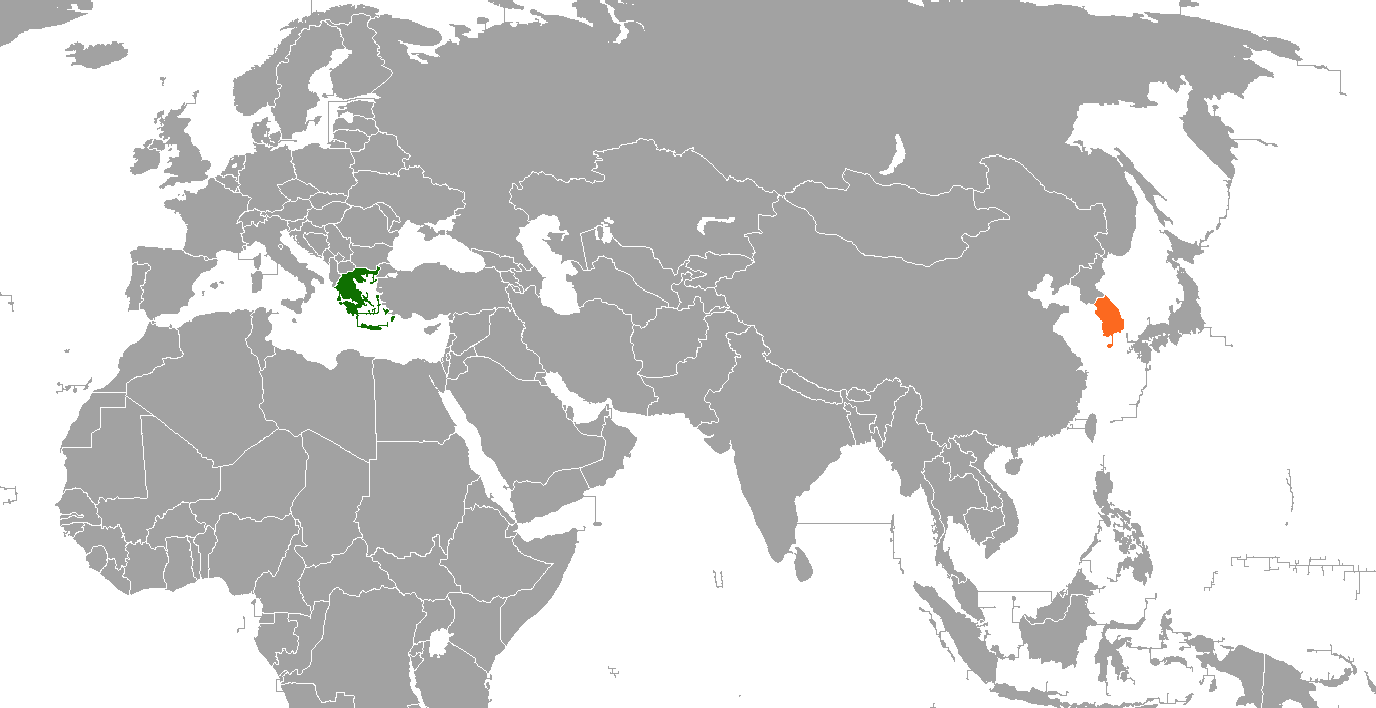
- Greece: South Korea

Greece–South Korea relations are the foreign relations between Greece and South Korea. Greece has an embassy in Seoul and an honorary consulate in Daejeon. South Korea has an embassy in Athens.

== History ==
Greece sent an expeditionary force to support South Korea during the Korean War from 1950 to 1953.

Both countries established diplomatic relations in 1961. South Korea opened its embassy in Athens on July 6, 1973. Greece opened its embassy in Seoul on February 15 1991.

== List of bilateral visits ==
From South Korea to Greece

- May 1995, Deputy Minister for Policy Planning and International Organizations Ban Ki-moon
- May 2000, Speaker of the National Assembly Park Joon-kyu
- October 2001, Minister of Maritime Affairs and Fisheries Yoo Sam-nam
- August 2002, Minister for Trade Hwang Doo-yun
- April 2004, Minister of Foreign Affairs Ban Ki-moon
- August 2004, Minister of Culture and Tourism Jung Dong-chae
- April 2006, Minister of Foreign Affairs Ban Ki-moon
- September 2006, President Roh Moo-hyun
- June 2007, Minister of Maritime Affairs and Fisheries Kang Moo-hyun
- October 2007, Minister of Maritime Affairs and Fisheries Kang Moo-hyun

From Greece to South Korea

- July 1987, Minister of Foreign Affairs Karolos Papoulias
- November 1990, Prime of Ministers Konstantinos Mitsotakis
- March 1998, Minister of the Mercantile Marine Stavros Soumakis
- October 2000, Alternate Foreign Minister Elisavet Papazoi
- February 2003, Alternate Foreign Minister Tasso Giannitsis
- November 2004, Minister of Agricultural Development Evangelos Bassiakos
- January 2005, Minister of Mercantile Marine Manolis Kefalogiannis
- June 2007, Minister of Transportation and Communications Michalis Liapis

== List of bilateral treaties ==
- Education agreement (July 23, 1970)
- Trade agreement (October 4, 1974)
- Agreement on abolition of visa requirements (February 25, 1979)
- Agreement on scientific and technological cooperation (May 16, 1994)
- Aviation agreement (January 25, 1995)
- Agreement on investment protection (January 25, 1995)
- Agreement on avoidance of double taxation (March 20, 1995)

== Resident diplomatic missions ==
- Greece has an embassy in Seoul.
- South Korea has an embassy in Athens.

== See also ==
- Foreign relations of Greece
- Foreign relations of South Korea
- Greek Expeditionary Force (Korea)
- Korean Orthodox Church
