= Greece–Saudi Arabia relations =

- Greece: Saudi Arabia

Greece–Saudi Arabia relations refers to the bilateral relations between Greece and Saudi Arabia. Greece has an embassy in Riyadh and a consulate-general in Jeddah. Saudi Arabia has an embassy in Athens.

== History ==
Diplomatic relations between the two countries started in 1926. A Greek embassy was established in Jeddah in 1943, then moved to Riyadh in 1963 and it became operational in 1985.

Saud, King of Saudi Arabia lived in exile in Greece before moving to Egypt. He sought end-of-life treatment in Greece and died there in 1969. He was called the "ideal tourist" because of his "lavish spending" while in Greece.

During the Yom Kippur War, Greece, which had refused to grant the US overflight or ground facilities to provide Israel with arms, allowed Soviet planes to pass through their air space to airlift military supplies to Egypt. Hence, it was excluded from the Arab oil boycott.

In February 2017, Greek President Prokopis Pavlopoulos led a delegation of eleven ministers and top businessmen to meet King Salman, a move that was hailed by both Greek and Saudi press as "ushering in a new era of bilateral relations".

In the beginning of 2021, as Saudi relations with Turkey continued to deteriorate, Saudi Arabia undertook steps to draw closer to Greece as well as other countries whose governments felt that their interests were threatened by alleged Turkey′s expansion in the Eastern Mediterranean. In March 2021, the Royal Saudi Air Force had a joint training exercise with Greece at the Souda Air Force Base, Crete. On 20 April 2021, both countries signed a defense agreement during a series of ministerial meetings in Riyadh, in which Greek armed forces would participate in supporting the Saudi defense capabilities. The deal provided for Greece lending a U.S.-made Patriot missile system battery to Saudi Arabia to protect critical energy facilities in the Kingdom.

In May 2021, Saudi minister of culture Prince Badr bin Abdullah bin Mohammed bin Farhan Al Saud met Greek President Katerina Sakellaropoulou in Athens to discuss a joint cultural program between the two countries, which would focus on archaeological development of the historic Qaryat al-Faw region.

On 8 December 2021, Greece and Saudi Arabia signed a maritime transport agreement in London. Greece's Minister for Shipping and Island Policy, Ioannis Plakiotakis and Saudi Arabia’s Transport Minister, Saleh bin Nasser Al-Jasser signed the agreement on behalf of their respective countries. Plakiotakis described the agreement as a "springboard for deepening their strategic partnership in shipping."

== See also ==
- Foreign relations of Greece
- Foreign relations of Saudi Arabia
- Greeks in Saudi Arabia
- Arab–Byzantine wars
