= Greece–Pakistan relations =

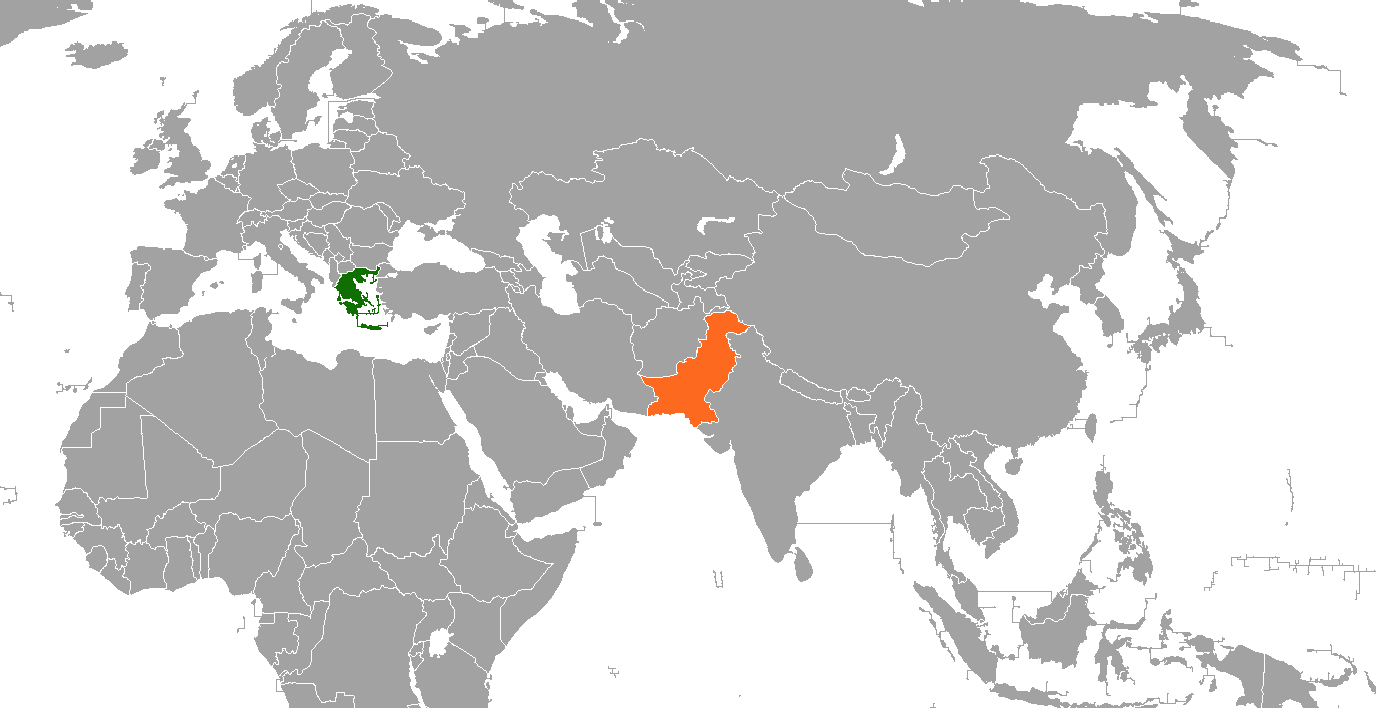
- Greece: Pakistan

Greece–Pakistan relations are foreign relations between Pakistan and Greece. Pakistan's first embassy in Athens was opened in 1975. Greece established an embassy in Islamabad in 1987.

== History ==
=== Ancient relations ===
For the ancient Greeks, “India" (Greek: Ινδία) referred to the land of the River Indus. The polity situated east of Persia and south of the Himalayas (with the exception of Serica). Although, during different periods of history, "India" referred to a much wider or much less extensive place. The Greeks referred to the ancient Indians as "Indói" (Greek: Ἰνδοί, lit. 'people of the Indus River'); the Indians referred to the Greeks as "Yonas (Yavanas)" in reference to the Ionians.

Part of today's Pakistan became part of the Indo-Greek Kingdom, founded by the successors of Alexander the Great.

=== Modern relations ===
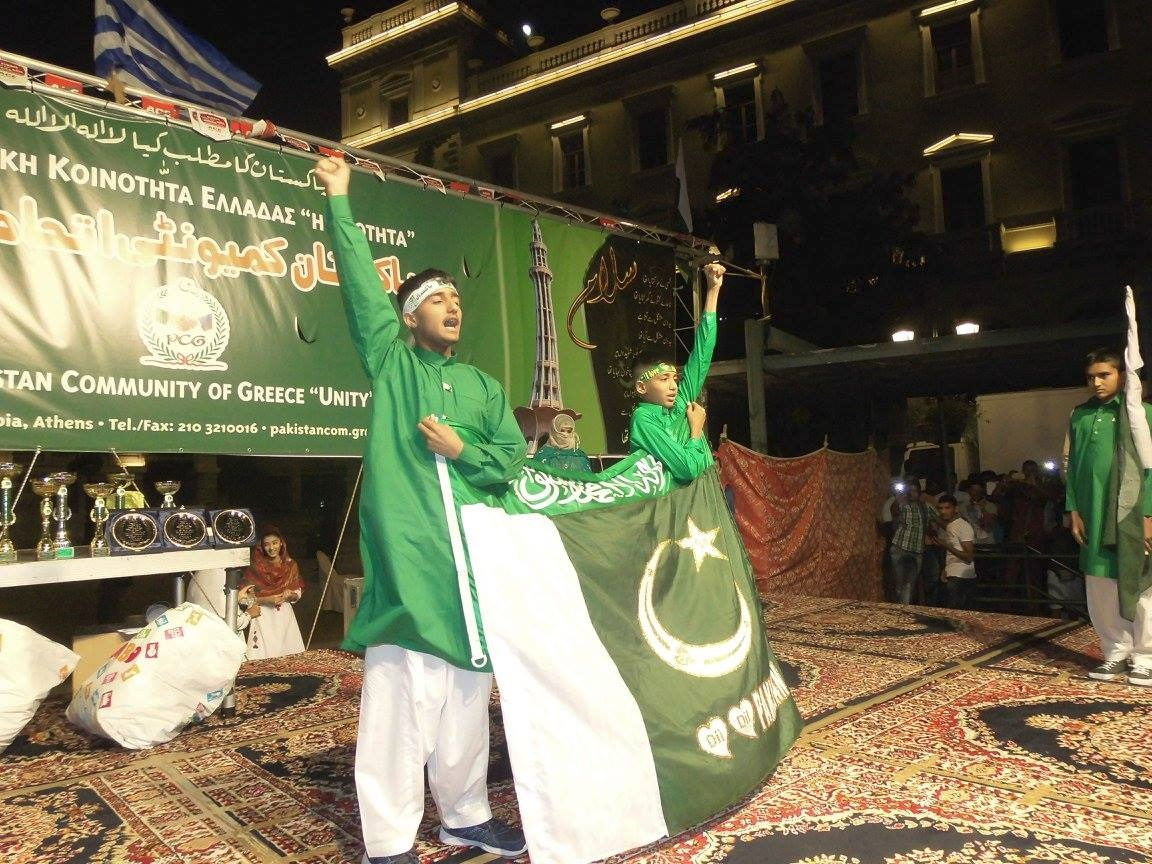
Pakistani migrant children pose for a ceremony in Athens, Greece.

The Greek architect and urban planner Constantinos Apostolou Doxiadis was the lead architect and planner of Islamabad.

Greece supports a successful outcome of the bilateral Indo-Pakistani dialogue and a peaceful resolution of the differences between the two countries, including the dispute over Kashmir.

== Diaspora ==
As of 2023, there are around 60,000 Pakistanis settled in Greece.

== High level visits ==
On 7 February 2022, the Minister of Migration and Asylum, Mr. Notis Mitarachi paid an official visit to Islamabad.

== Migrant crisis ==
The issue of unlawful migrants, including criminals posed a serious problem that the Pakistani Federal Intelligence Agency opened offices in Greece to help track down and remove these people from within Greece.

== See also ==
- Foreign relations of Pakistan
- Foreign relations of Greece
