= Greece–Indonesia relations =

- Greece: Indonesia

Greece and Indonesia established diplomatic relations on 27 December 1949. The two nations have enjoyed good relations ever since. Greece has an embassy in Jakarta, while Indonesia has an embassy in Athens. Greece and Indonesia share some similarities; both are democracies, archipelagic nations, as well as possessing notable archaeological sites. Therefore, cooperations in politics, maritime transportation and shipping, culture and tourism have potential to be explored.

== History ==
The ancient Greek writer Ptolemy, described many places including places in Indonesia like the Barousai (Ancient Greek: Βαροῦσαι) and Yabadiou or Sabadiou (Ancient Greek: Ιαβαδίου or Σαβαδίου), which researchers identify respectively as Barus in Northern Sumatra and Java. Also the Names of Indonesia itself comes from Greek (Ινδονησία), which means Indian Islands.

The diplomatic relations between Greece and Indonesia was established in 1949, however it was not until the 1990s that both nations finally established resident ambassadors and embassies in each respective countries. The embassy of Indonesia in Athens was opened since 1994, while the embassy of Greece in Jakarta was opened in 1997. A few dozen Greeks reside in Indonesia, mostly in Jakarta and Bali, with most of them being freelance professionals.

== Cooperations ==
Greek and Indonesian governments signed numbers of cooperations and agreements, such as air service agreement. Both nations also has agreed to establish cooperations in maritime and tourism sectors, which includes shipping merchant and cruise tourism. During the COVID-19 pandemic, Greece donated more than 700,000 vaccines to Indonesia.

== See also ==
- Foreign relations of Greece
- Foreign relations of Indonesia
