= Greece–Holy See relations =

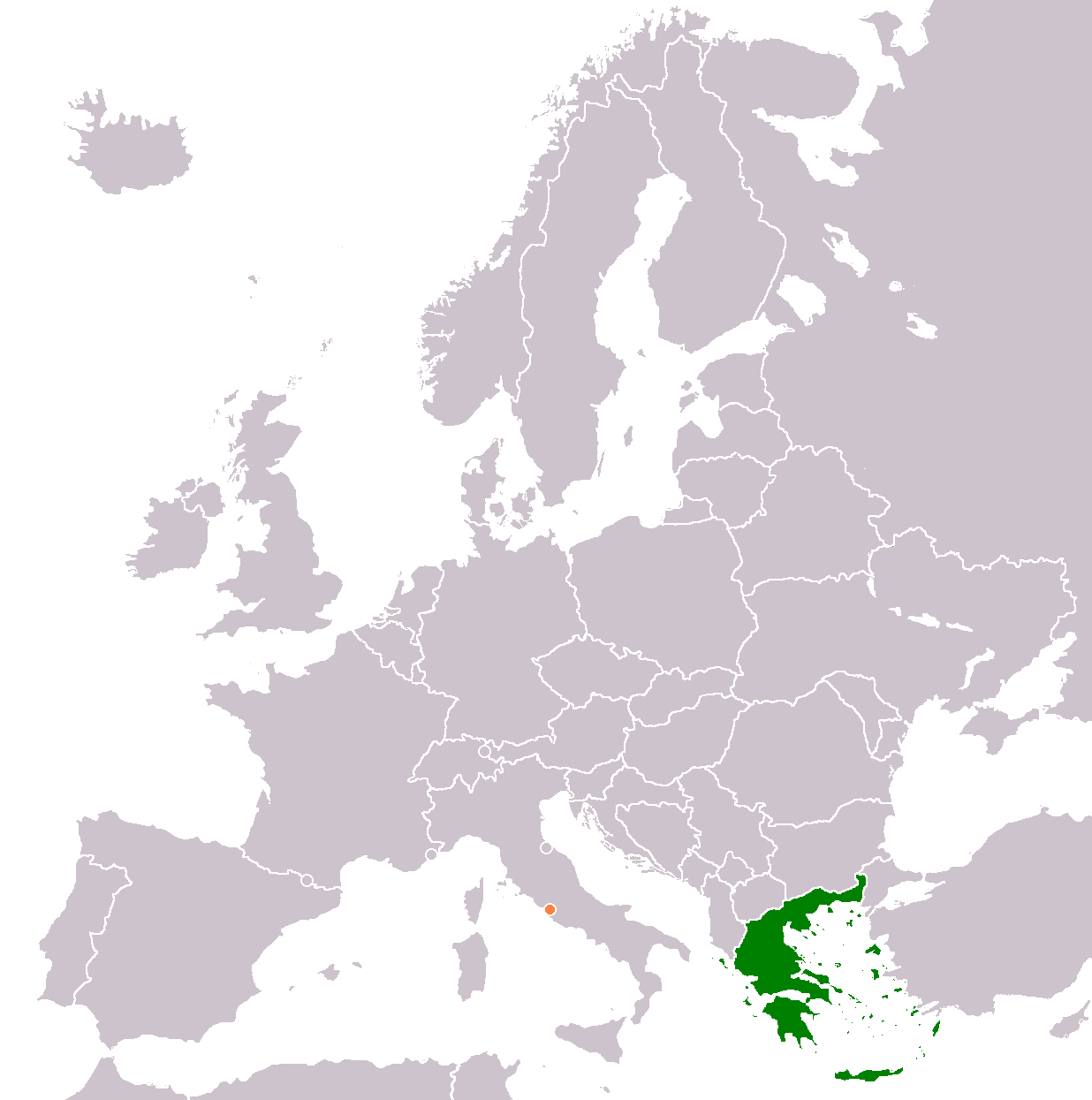
- Greece: Vatican City

Greece–Holy See relations of diplomatic character were established in 1980. The Holy See immediately set up its Apostolic Nunciature to Greece in Athens. The Greek ambassador to the Holy See resided at first in Paris, where he was concurrently accredited to France; however, in 1988 a separate Greek embassy to the Holy See, situated in Rome, was set up.

In May 2001, Pope John Paul II made a visit of pilgrimage to Greece.

== History ==
The East-West Schism divided medieval Christendom into Orthodox Christian and Western Roman Catholic. Relations between East and West had long been embittered by political and ecclesiastical differences and theological disputes.

=== Ecumenical relations ===
Relations with Greece are largely related to ecumenical relations with the Greek Orthodox Church and the Greek Ecumenical Patriarch of Constantinople. In 2007 Ecumenical Patriarch Bartholomew I of Constantinople gave his approval to the Declaration of Ravenna, a Catholic–Orthodox document concerning the Protos, although future discussions are to be held on the concrete ecclesiological exercise of papal primacy.

=== Migrant crisis ===
On 2016, Pope Francis made a well-publicized visit to the Greek island of Lesvos to meet migrants and refugees. Lesvos was the home for many migrants and refugees who have fled war and violence in the Middle East and North Africa.

In December 2021, during a two-day visit to Greece, Pope Francis returned to Lesvos and in an address to asylum seekers on the island, he castigated European countries for allowing the Mediterranean to become a “desolate sea of death”.

=== Fragments of the Parthenon ===
In May 2023, Pope Francis returned 3 fragments of the Parthenon to Greece, a decision described as 'heroic' by the Minister of Culture, Lina Mendoni.

== See also ==
- Foreign relations of Greece
- Foreign relations of the Holy See
