= Finland–Greece relations =

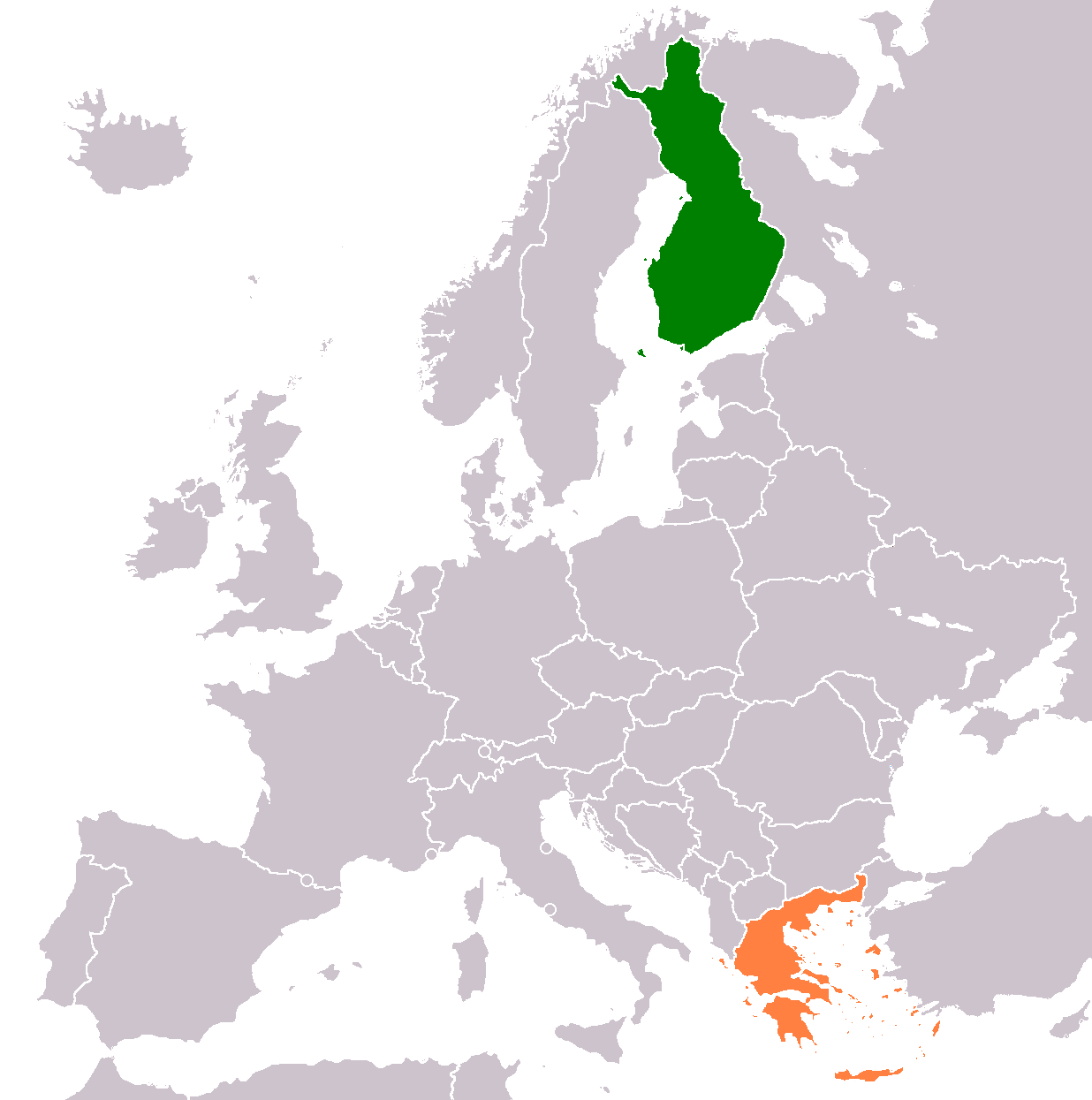
- Finland: Greece

Diplomatic mission
- Embassy of Finland, Athens: Embassy of Greece, Helsinki

Finnish-Greek relations are foreign relations between Finland and Greece. Greece was among the first countries to recognize the independence of Finland, on January 5, 1918. Both countries established diplomatic relations in 1920. Since February 1, 1977, Finland has had an embassy in Athens. For a long period, Finland was represented in Greece through its embassies either in Bucharest, Rome or Belgrade. Greece has an embassy in Helsinki.

Both countries are full members of the European Union, NATO, Council of Europe, and Eurozone. There are 1,681 Greeks living in Finland, and 1,600 Finns living in Greece. Greece supported the initial application that Finland submitted in May 2022 to join NATO. In September 2022, Greek Parliament voted to ratify the application, contributing to the process that saw Finland officially become the 31st member of NATO on 4 April 2023.

== Resident diplomatic missions ==
- Finland has an embassy in Athens.
- Greece has an embassy in Helsinki.

== Gallery ==
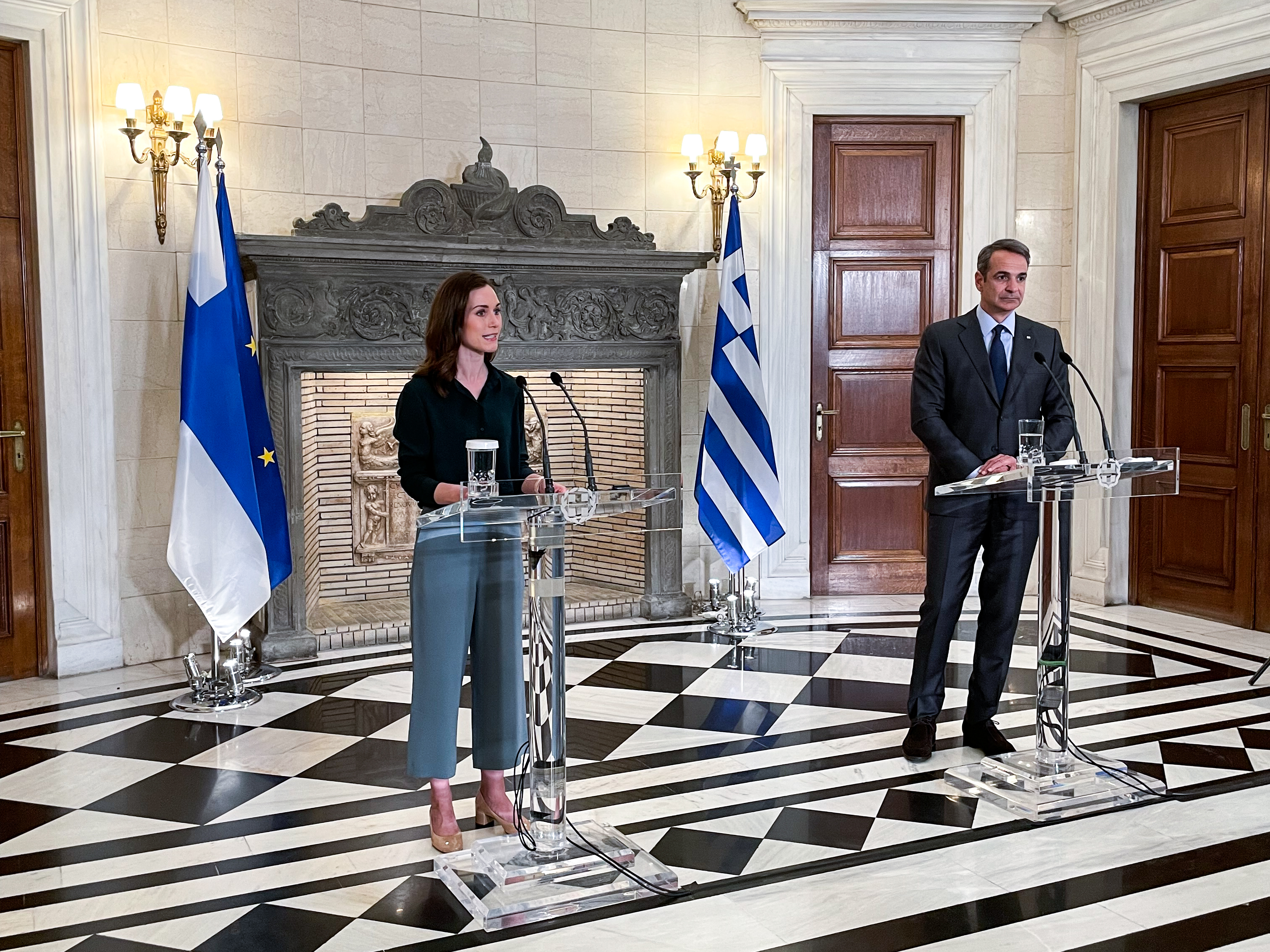
Finnish Prime Minister Sanna Marin met with Greek Prime Minister Kyriakos Mitsotakis in 2022

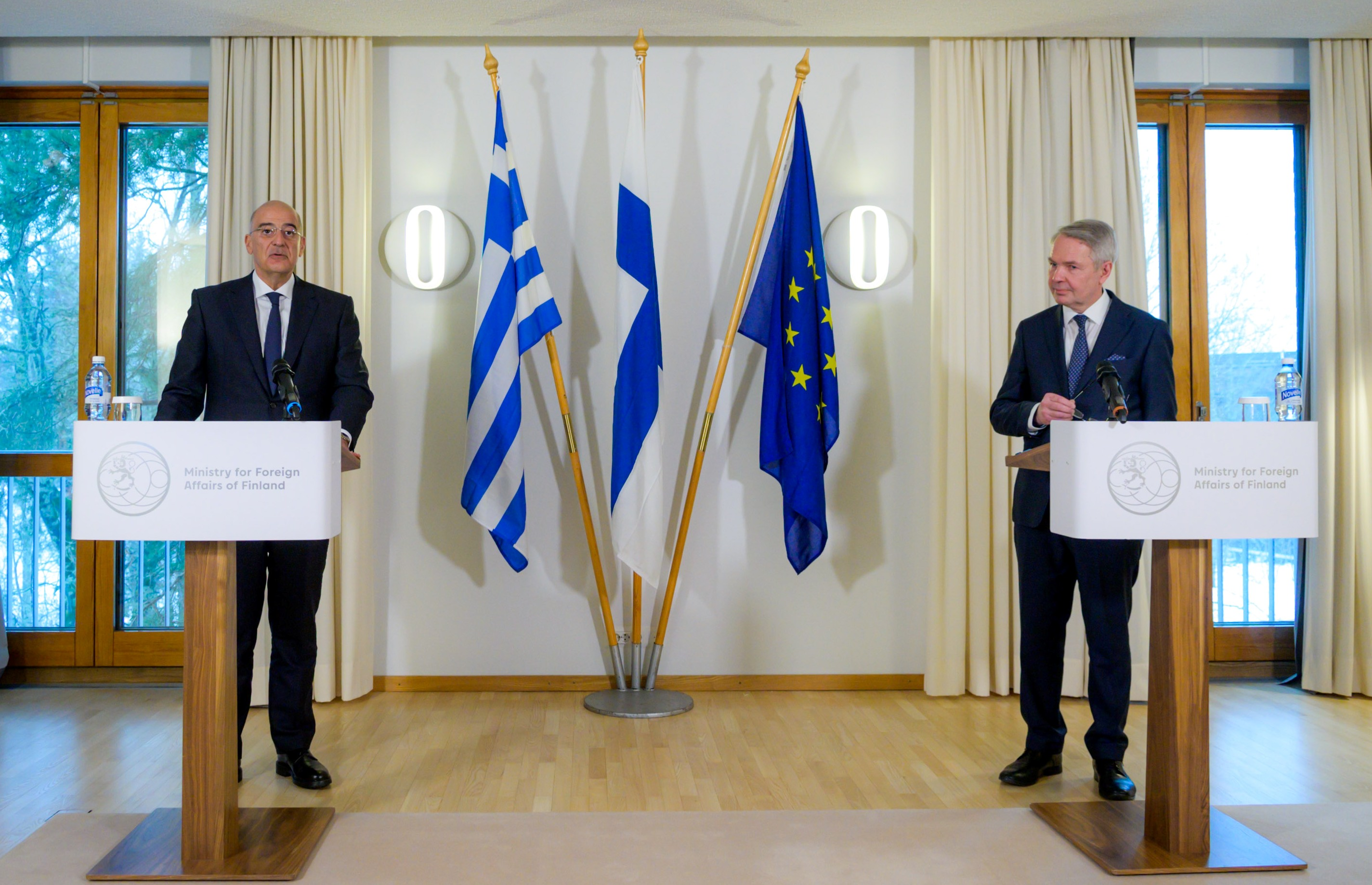
Pekka Haavisto and Nikos Dendias in 2022

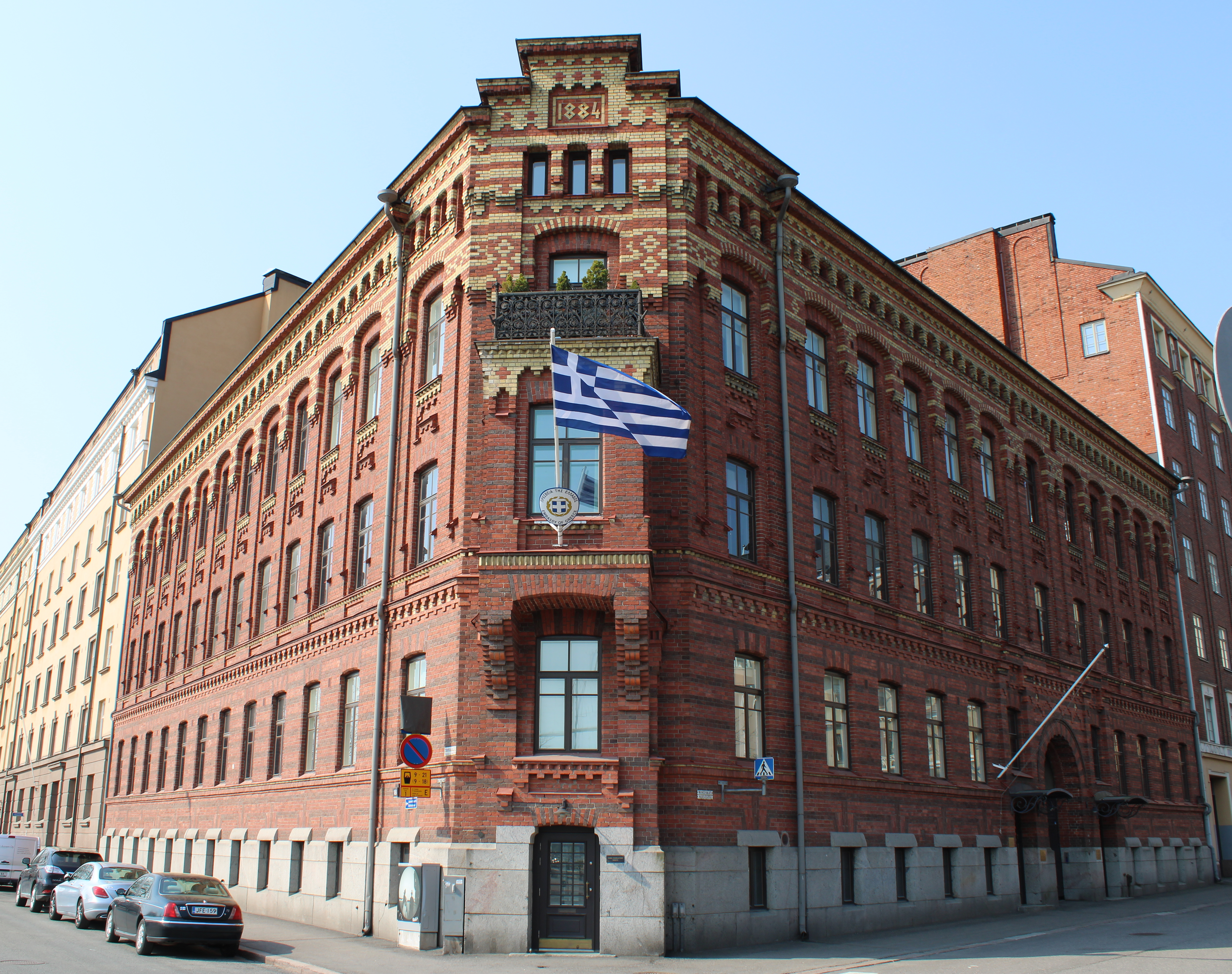
Embassy of Greece in Helsinki

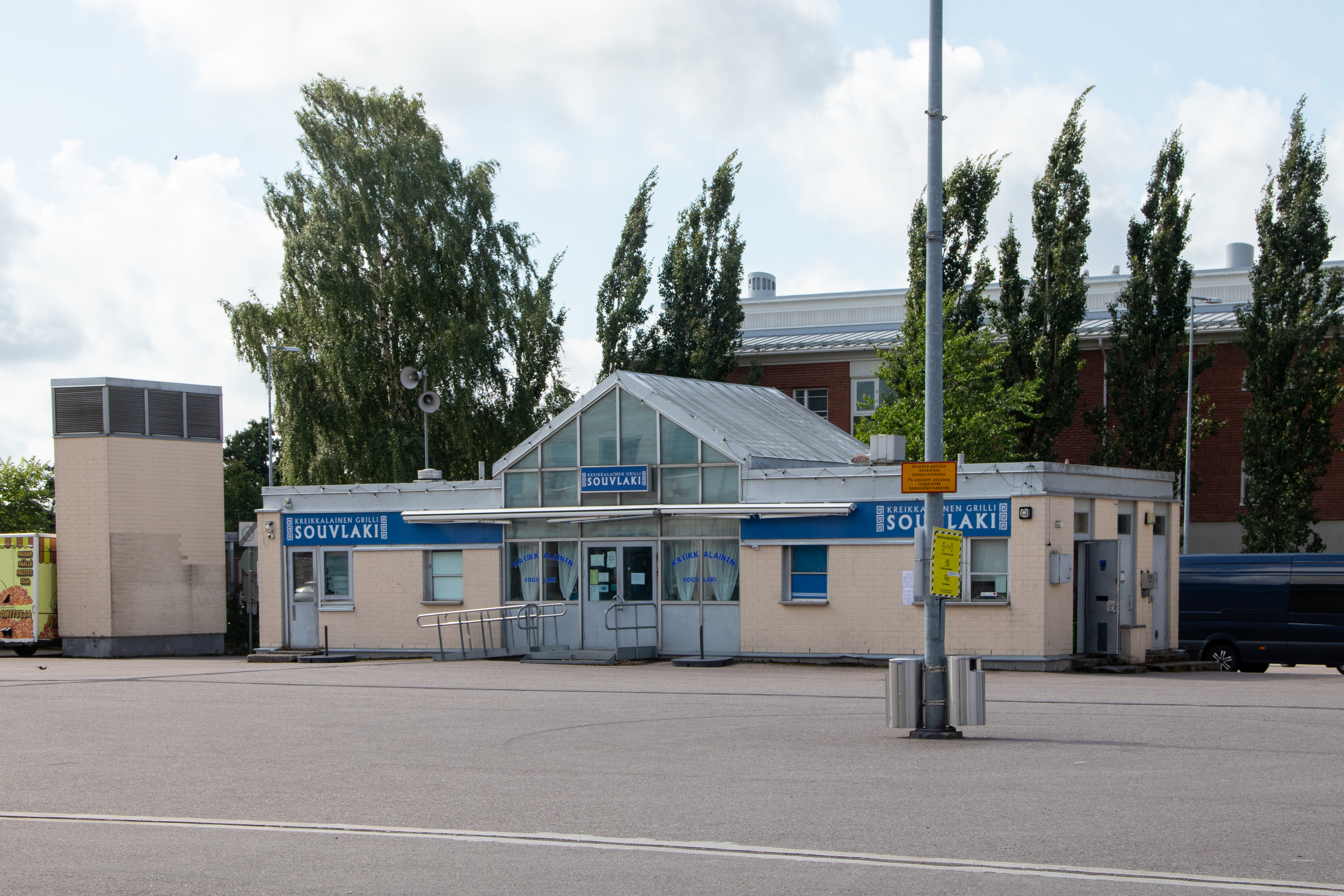
Greek restaurant in Vantaa, Finland

== See also ==
- Foreign relations of Finland
- Foreign relations of Greece
- Greeks in Finland
