= Embassy of Greece, London =

Embassy of Greece in London
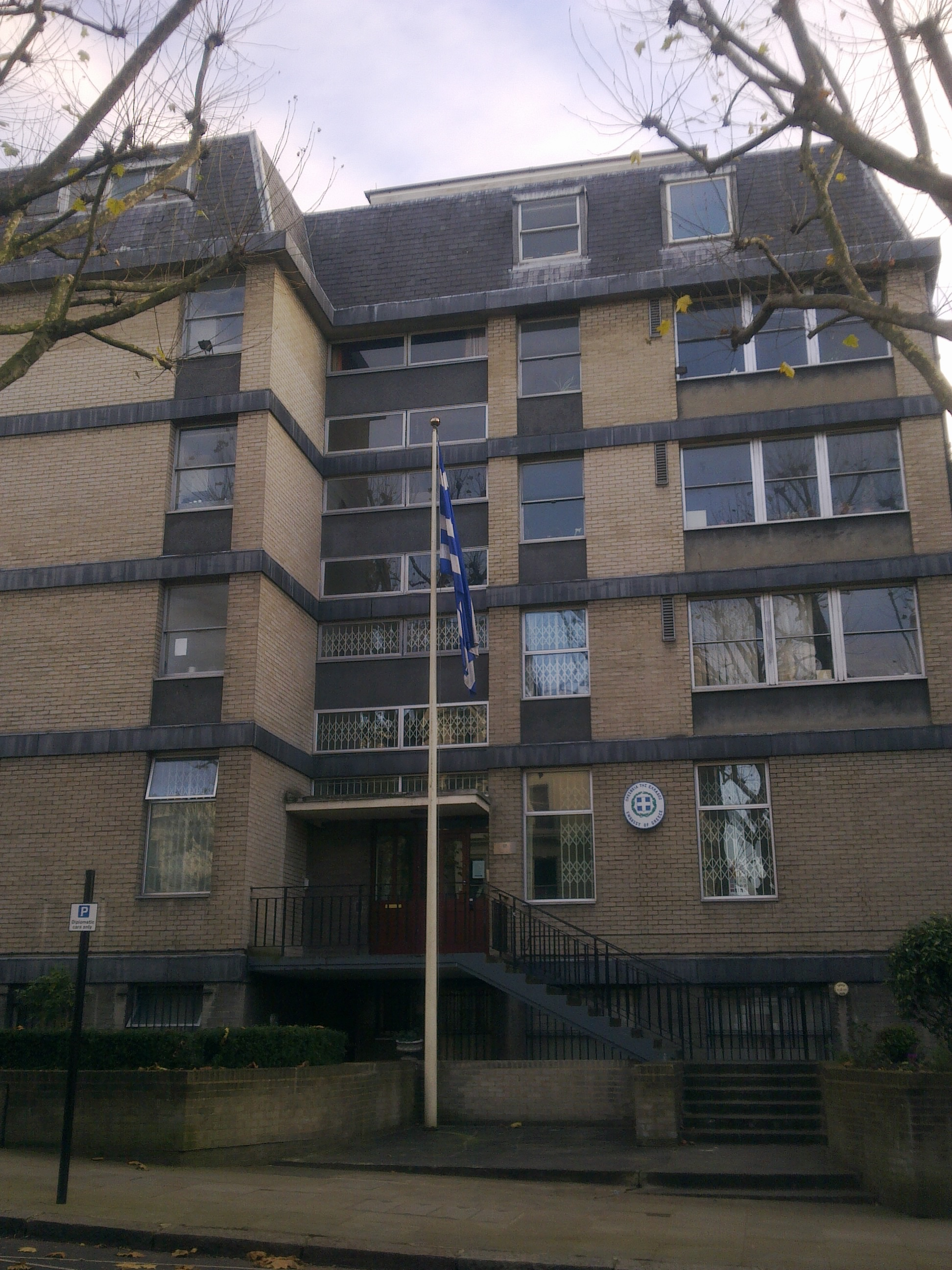
- Location: Holland Park, London
- Address: 1A Holland Park, London, W11 3TP
- Coordinates: 51°30′19.8″N 0°12′16.2″W
- Ambassador: Konstantinos Bikas

The Embassy of Greece in London is the diplomatic mission of Greece in the United Kingdom.

A Greek embassy in London was established shortly after Greek independence in 1828.

From 1921, it was located at 51 Upper Brook Street in Mayfair. A blue plaque there commemorates the poet George Seferis, who served as the Greek Ambassador from 1957 to 1961.

In 1975, the embassy moved to its current location in Holland Park, with the Mayfair building remaining as the Greek Ambassador's Residence.

In 1999, Kurdish protesters temporarily occupied the embassy in protest at the role of Greece in the capture of Kurdistan Workers' Party leader Abdullah Öcalan in Kenya.

Greece also maintains a National Tourism Organisation Office at 4 Great Portland Street, W1W 8QJ.

== Gallery ==
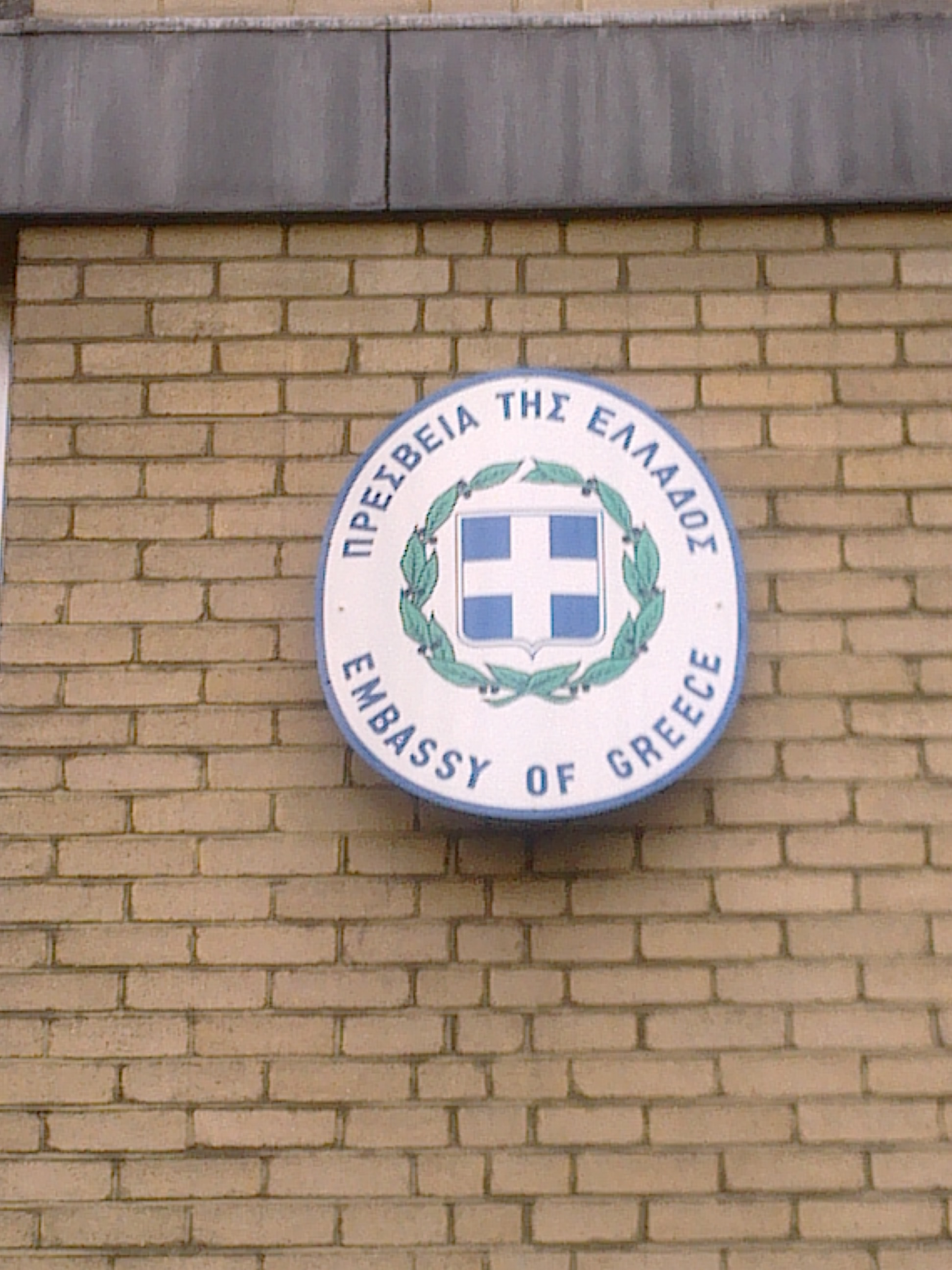
Plaque outside the embassy in English and Greek depicting the Coat of arms of Greece

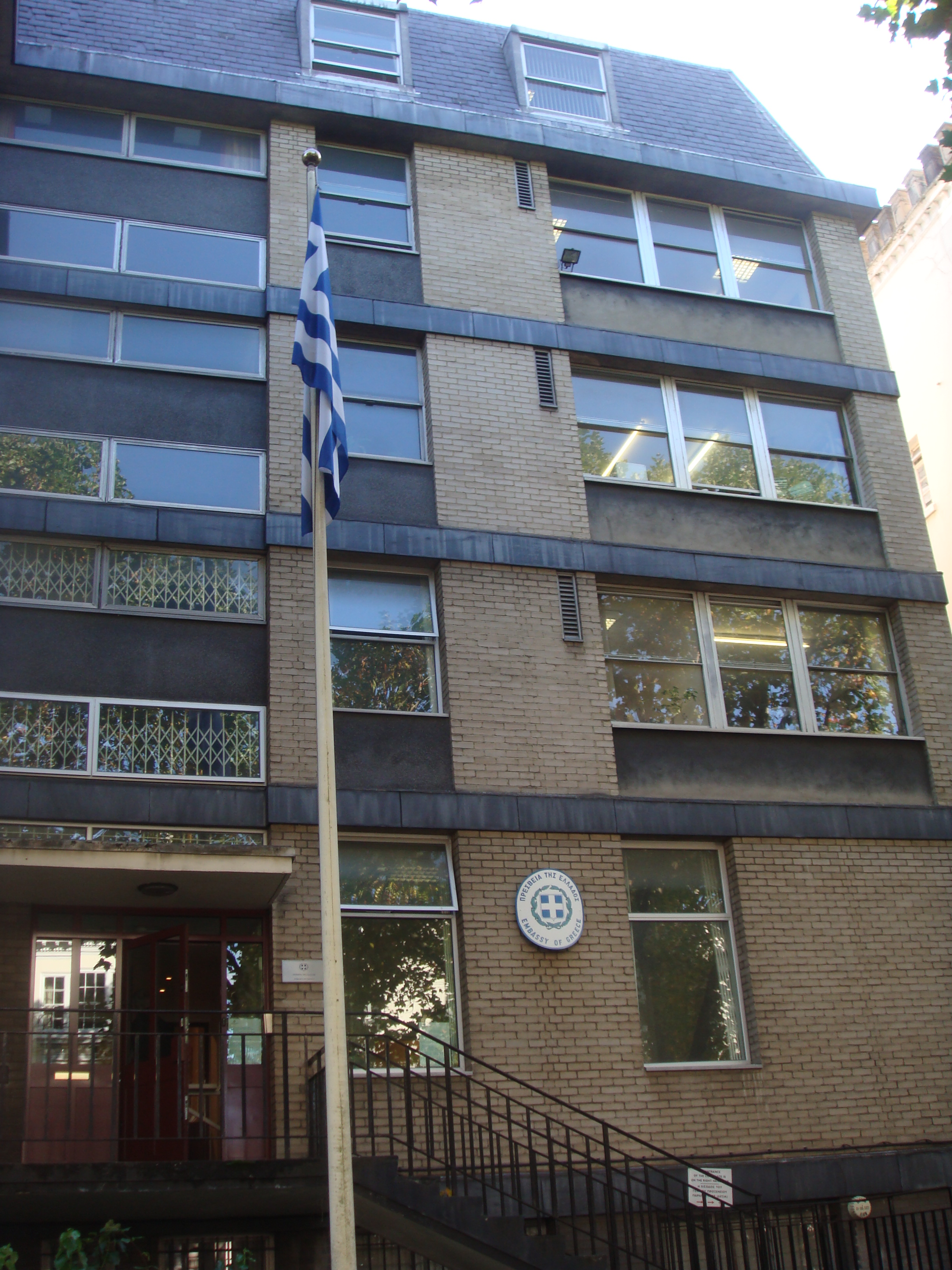
The embassy
