= Kostas Sarantidis =

Greek-Vietnamese guerrilla fighter (1927–2021)

Κώστας Σαραντίδης
- Kostas Sarantidis; Nguyễn Văn Lập
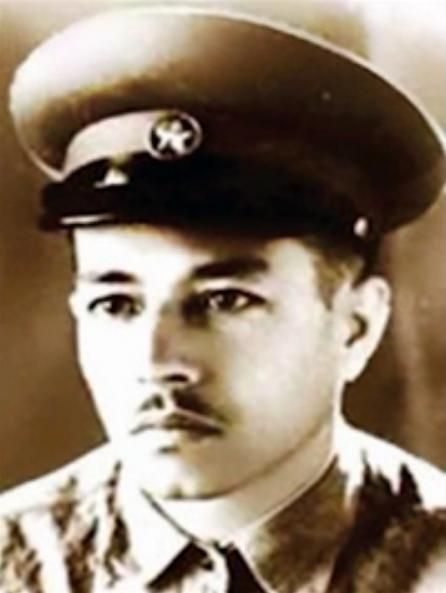
- Born: 1927; Thessaloniki, Second Hellenic Republic
- Died: 25 June 2021 (aged 94); Athens, Greece
- Occupations: Soldier, miner
- Known for: Participation in the First Indochina War
- Political party: Communist Party of Greece; Communist Party of Vietnam

Kostas Sarantidis (Greek: Κώστας Σαραντίδης; 1927 – 25 June 2021), also known in Vietnamese as Nguyễn Văn Lập, was a Greek captain of the People's Army of Vietnam who fought with the Viet Minh during the First Indochina War, seeking independence for Vietnam from the French colonial empire. He received Vietnamese citizenship in 2010, and in 2013 he was awarded the order of Hero of the People's Armed Forces.

== Early life ==
Kostas Sarantidis was born in 1927 in Thessaloniki, Greece to Asia Minor refugees. In the autumn of 1943 during the Axis occupation of Greece in World War II, he was arrested selling smuggled tobacco and was sent on foot to Nazi forced labour camps in Germany. He managed to escape near Vienna and stole a military uniform which he used to disguise himself as a German until the end of the war.

== Life in Vietnam ==
After the end of the war, Sarantidis went to Rome, and tried to be repatriated to Greece. This, however, proved impossible as he lacked any identity documents. Without any means of supporting himself, Sarantidis was lured into the French Foreign Legion by the prospect of living an adventurous life and meeting beautiful women. After joining the Legion, Sarantidis was initially sent to Algeria and landed in Indochina in 1946. While there, he and the other legionnaires were told that the duration of their deployment would be short and that their mission would be to disarm the Japanese and restore order. Sarantidis disliked the oppression of the local population by the French colonial troops. After two months with the Legion, he contacted Viet Minh spies and defected to them, carrying with him his rifle and a machine gun. He was given the name Nguyễn Văn Lập and served in various posts and participated in many battles. Eventually he rose to the rank of captain. In 1949, he was admitted to the Communist Party of Vietnam.

After the end of the war in 1954 and the division of Vietnam into northern and southern zones, Sarantidis moved to North Vietnam and retired from the army. At that time, he was married to a nurse who was accused of reactionism and was imprisoned. Sarantidis worked as a German translator and later as a miner. He also remarried to a Vietnamese woman, with whom he had four children.

== Later life in Greece ==
From the day he was arrested in Thessaloniki until the early 1950s, Sarantidis had not communicated with his family who presumed him dead. Near the end of the war, he started to exchange letters with them and in 1965, he decided to return to Greece. With the aid of one of his brothers, who helped the Sarantidis family to be issued passports, Sarantidis moved to Thessaloniki. In the beginning, he faced severe economic difficulties as he was unemployed for several months. Eventually, he managed to find a job as a driver for Pechiney, where he worked for several years until his retirement. The Sarantidis family had a fourth child who was born in Thessaloniki. While in Greece, Sarantidis joined the Communist Party of Greece and worked to help Vietnam as well as promoting Greek-Vietnamese relations. Sarantidis was also active in helping children in Vietnam who had been affected by the Agent Orange/dioxin toxicant.

Sarantidis escorted the then Greek President Karolos Papoulias on his official visit to Vietnam in October 2008. In 2010, Sarantidis was given Vietnamese citizenship and a passport. In 2013, he was named a Hero of the People's Armed Forces, becoming the only foreigner to be honored in this way. Additionally, he was awarded several honorary titles by both the Vietnamese Party and State, including the Friendship Order in 2011, the Victory Medal, Third Class, and the Resistance War Medal, Second Class.

Sarantidis died on 25 June 2021, aged 94. His remains were brought to Vietnam and honored at a memorial service in Da Nang city in August 2022.
