= List of ambassadors of Greece to the United States =

List of Greek ambassadors to the U.S.

Ambassador of Greek to the United States
- Residence: Embassy of Greece, Washington, D.C.
- Appointer: Minister of Foreign Affairs
- Inaugural holder: Lampros Koromilas
- Formation: 1907

The Greek ambassador in Washington, D.C. is the official representative of the Hellenic Republic Government to the Government of the United States.

== History ==
After the War of Independence, which started in 1821, Greece was declared an independent state but it was not until February 3, 1830 that the Independence was recognized by the Great Powers with the signing of the Protocol of London. On May 7, 1832 Otto of Greece arrived in Nafplion and Greece became a Kingdom. The United States, however, only recognized the Greek state in 1833. In December 1837 a commercial treaty was signed, which regulated trade between the two countries. The first Greek consulate to be established was New Orleans in 1866 with Nicolas Benachi as the first Greek consul there. In 1867, Demetrios Nicholas Botassis was named Consul General of Greece in New York City.

== Ambassadors ==
List of Chiefs of protocol:

- December 23, 1907 Lambros Koromilas, Minister Resident
- July 29, 1909 Lambros Koromilas
- March 13, 1913 A. Vouros, Charge d'Affaires
- August 17, 1914 Agamemnon Schliemann
- December 7, 1914 A. Vouros, Charge d’Affaires a.i.

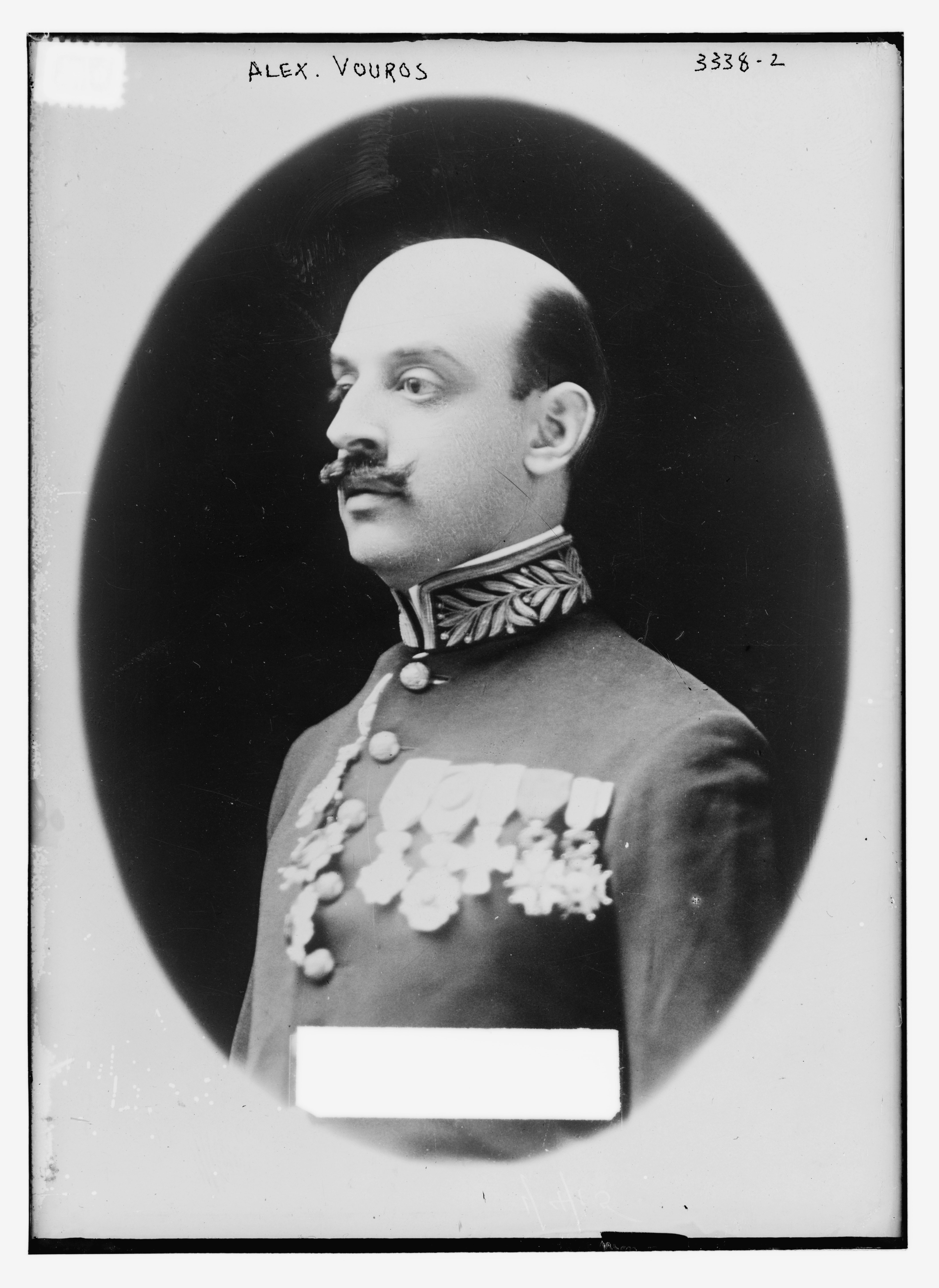
A. Vouros

- September 21, 1917 Georgios Roussos
- October 25, 1920 Georgios Drakopoulos, in charge of Legation
- December 15, 1920 Georgios Drakopoulos Charge d’Affaires a.i.
- January 11, 1923 Michael Tsamados, Charge d’Affaires a.i.
- May 22, 1924 Cimon Diamantopoulos, Charge d'Affaires a.i.
- June 30, 1924 Vasilios Mammonos, Charge d'Affaires a.i.
- August 21, 1924 Konstantinos D. Xanthopoulos, Charge d’Affaires a.i.
- December 12, 1924 Charalambos Simopoulos
- April 26, 1935 Dimitrios Sikelianos
- February 7, 1940 Cimon Diamantopoulos

Legation raised to Embassy

- October 6, 1942 Cimon Diamantopoulos
- December 6, 1946 Pavlos Oikonomou-Gouras, Charge d'Affaires a.i.
- June 3, 1947 Vasilios Dendramis
- December 8, 1954 Athanase George Politis
- October 6, 1958 Alexis Liatis
- February 13, 1962 Alexandros Matsas
- September 20, 1967 Christos Palamas
- November 13, 1969 Basil Vitsaksis
- December 1, 1972 Ioannis Argyrios Sorokos
- February 27, 1974 Konstantinos Panagiotakos
- September 3, 1974 Menelaos Alexandrakis
- August 16, 1979 Alexandros Koundouriotis, Charge d’Affaires ad interim
- September 4, 1979 John Tzounis
- December 15, 1981 Georgios Sioris, Charge d’Affaires ad interim
- January 13, 1982 Nikolaos Karandreas
- September 10, 1983 Georgios Sioris, Charge d'Affaires ad interim
- September 19, 1983 Georgios Papoulias
- September 21, 1989 Christos Zacharakis
- June 15, 1993 Loucas Tsilas
- July 6, 1998 Alexander Philon
- July 2, 2002 Georgios Savvaidis
- October 3, 2005 Alexandros Mallias
- July 20, 2009 Vassilis Kaskarelis
- September 19, 2012 Christos Panagopoulos
- June 2016 Haris Lalacos
- February 2020 Alexandra Papadopoulou
- November 2023 Ekaterini Nassika

== See also ==
- Greece–United States relations
- List of ambassadors of the United States to Greece
