= Embassy of Greece, Washington, D.C. =

Embassy

Embassy of the Hellenic Republic in Washington, D.C.
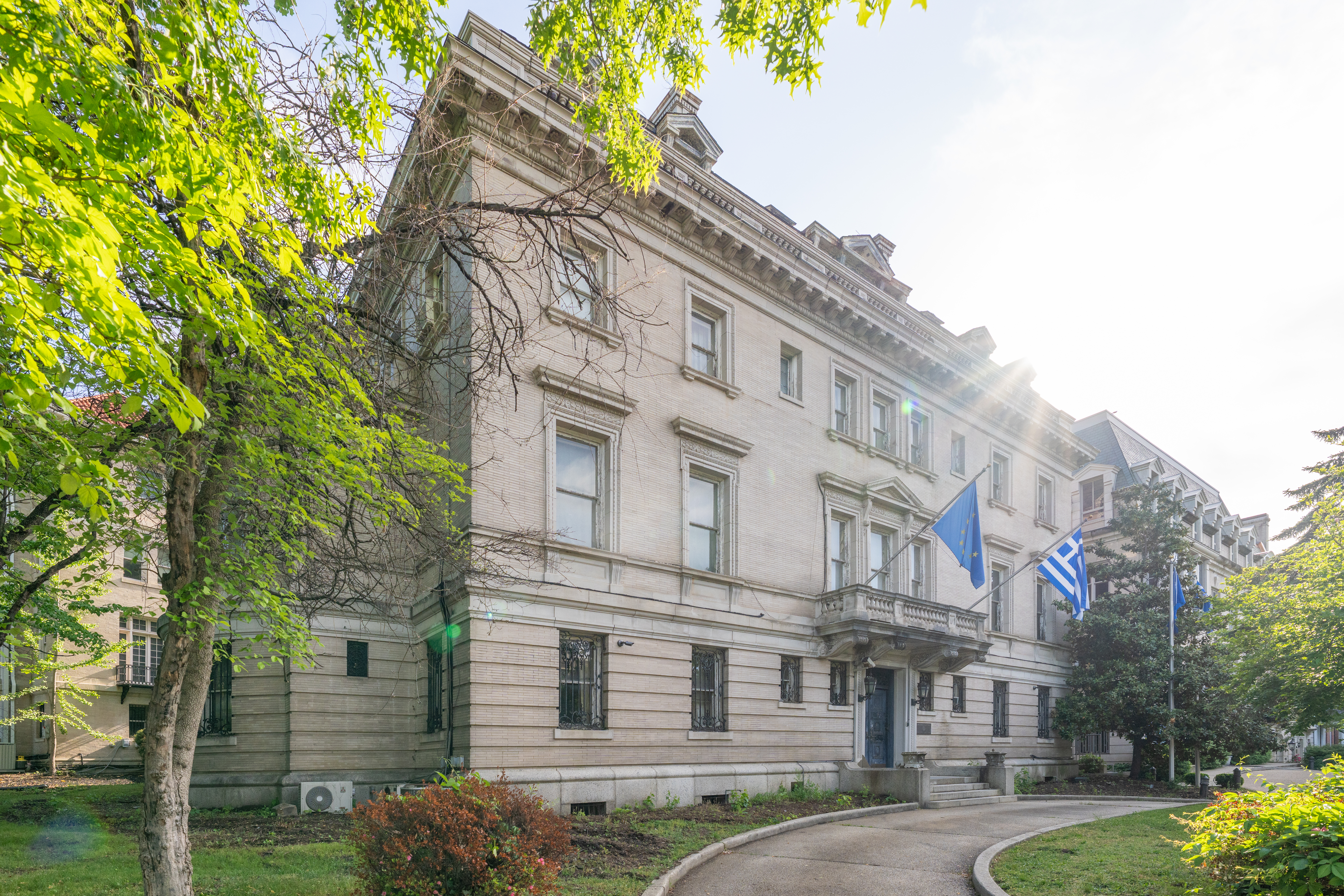
- The Embassy of Greece
- Location: Embassy Row, Washington, D.C.
- Address: 2217 Massachusetts Avenue, Northwest, Washington, D.C.
- Coordinates: 38°54′44″N 77°02′59″W
- Ambassador: Alexandra Papadopoulou
- Website: Office website

The Embassy of Greece in Washington, D.C. is the Hellenic Republic's diplomatic mission to the United States. It is located at 2217 Massachusetts Avenue, Northwest, Washington, D.C. in the Embassy Row neighborhood, near Sheridan Circle. The embassy complex consists of three buildings. The current ambassador is Alexandra Papadopoulou (since 2020) and first woman in this post.

== History ==
After the War of Independence, which started in 1821, Greece was declared an independent state but it was not until 3 February 1830 that the Independence was recognized by the Great Powers with the signing of the Protocol of London. On 7 May 1832 Otto of Greece arrived in Nafplion and Greece became a Kingdom. The United States, however, recognized the Greek state only in 1833. In December 1837 a commercial treaty was signed, which regulated trade between the two countries. The first Greek consulate to be established was that of New Orleans, in 1866. Records indicate that Nicolas Benachi was the first Greek consul in New Orleans. In 1867, Demetrios Nicholas Botassis was named Consul General of Greece in New York City.

== Former Ambassadors ==
- December 23, 1907 Lambros Koromilas, Minister Resident
- July 29, 1909 Lambros Koromilas
- March 13, 1913 A. Vouros, Charge d'Affaires
- August 17, 1914 Agamemnon Schliemann
- December 7, 1914 A. Vouros, Charge d’Affaires a.i.
- September 21, 1917 Georgios Roussos
- October 25, 1920 Georgios Drakopoulos, in charge of Legation
- December 15, 1920 Georgios Drakopoulos Charge d’Affaires a.i.
- January 11, 1923 Michael Tsamados, Charge d’Affaires a.i.
- May 22, 1924 Cimon Diamantopoulos, Charge d'Affaires a.i.
- June 30, 1924 Vasilios Mammonos, Charge d'Affaires a.i.
- August 21, 1924 Konstantinos D. Xanthopoulos, Charge d’Affaires a.i.
- December 12, 1924 Charalambos Simopoulos
- April 26, 1935 Dimitrios Sikelianos
- February 7, 1940 Cimon Diamantopoulos

Legation raised to Embassy

- October 6, 1942 Cimon Diamantopoulos
- December 6, 1946 Pavlos Oikonomou-Gouras, Charge d'Affaires a.i.
- June 3, 1947 Vasilios Dendramis
- December 8, 1954 Athanase George Politis
- October 6, 1958 Alexis Liatis
- February 13, 1962 Alexandros Matsas
- September 20, 1967 Christos Palamas
- November 13, 1969 Basil Vitsaksis
- December 1, 1972 Ioannis Argyrios Sorokos
- February 27, 1974 Konstantinos Panagiotakos
- September 3, 1974 Menelaos Alexandrakis
- August 16, 1979 Alexandros Koundouriotis, Charge d’Affaires ad interim
- September 4, 1979 John Tzounis
- December 15, 1981 Georgios Sioris, Charge d’Affaires ad interim
- January 13, 1982 Nikolaos Karandreas
- September 10, 1983 Georgios Sioris, Charge d'Affaires ad interim
- September 19, 1983 Georgios Papoulias
- September 21, 1989 Christos Zacharakis
- June 15, 1993 Loucas Tsilas
- July 6, 1998 Alexander Philon
- July 2, 2002 Georgios Savvaidis

| Diplomatic agrément | Diplomatic accreditation | ambassador |
|---|---|---|
| September 29, 2005 | October 3, 2005 | Alexandros Mallias |
| June 24, 2009 | July 20, 2009 | Vassilis Kaskarelis |
| September 17, 2012 | September 19, 2012 | Christos Panagopoulos |
| | June 2016 | Haris Lalacos |

== Consulates ==
The embassy is also responsible for other eight Greek diplomatic missions (six consulates-general and two consulates) throughout the United States, each one responsible for certain states:

- General Consulates
  - Consulate General in Boston States of Jurisdiction: Maine, Massachusetts, New Hampshire, Rhode Island, Vermont
  - Consulate General in Chicago States of Jurisdiction: Illinois, Indiana, Iowa, Kansas, Michigan, Minnesota, Missouri, North Dakota, Nebraska, Ohio, South Dakota, Wisconsin
  - Consulate General in Los Angeles States of Jurisdiction: Arizona, California (Zip Codes 90001-92999), Colorado, Hawaii, Nevada, New Mexico, South Nevada
  - Consulate General in New York City States of Jurisdiction : Connecticut, New Jersey, New York, Pennsylvania
  - Consulate General in San Francisco States of Jurisdiction: Alaska, California (Zip Codes 93000 and up), Idaho, Montana, North Nevada, Oregon, Utah, Washington, Wyoming
  - Consulate General in Tampa States of Jurisdiction: Alabama, Florida, Mississippi
- Consulates
  - Consulate in Atlanta States of Jurisdiction: Georgia, Kentucky, South Carolina, Tennessee
  - Consulate in Houston States of Jurisdiction: Oklahoma, Texas, Arkansas, Louisiana, Puerto Rico, US Virgin Islands

== See also ==
- Consulate General of the United States in Thessaloniki
- Diplomatic missions of Greece
- Statue of Eleftherios Venizelos, installed outside the embassy
- Embassy of the United States in Athens
- Foreign relations of Greece
- Greece–United States relations
- List of diplomatic missions in Washington, D.C.
- List of ambassadors of the United States to Greece
