= Koromilas =

Koromilas is a Greek surname. Notable people with the surname include:

- Giannis Koromilas (born 2002), Greek footballer
- Lambros Koromilas (c. 1856–1923), Greek economist and diplomat
- Roula Koromila (born 1957), Greek television presenter
