= Dimitrios Kaklamanos =

Greek diplomat, journalist and writer

- Δημήτριος Κάκλαμανος
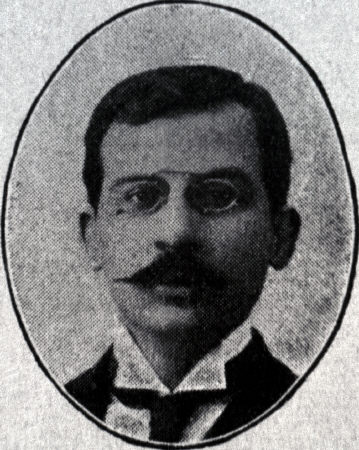

Greek Ambassador to the United Kingdom
- In office October 8, 1918 – 1935
- Preceded by: Ioannis Gennadios
- Succeeded by: Charalambos Simopoulos

Personal details
- Born: January 1, 1872 Nauplia
- Died: June 7, 1949 (aged 77) London
- Education: Fellow of Academy of Athens, 1947

Dimitrios Kaklamanos (Greek: Δημήτριος Κακλαμάνος; 1872–1949), known in English as Demetrius Caclamanos was a Greek diplomat, journalist and writer and corresponding member of the Academy of Athens, who was from 1918 to 1935 minister to the Court of St. James.

In 1892 he was director of the newspaper Politeia and then editor of To Asty. In 1901 he entered the diplomatic service. In 1907 he was consul in Odessa. From 1910 to 1912 he was secretary of the Greek embassy in Paris. From 1912 to 1914 he was chargé d'affaires of the Greek Ambassador to Italy. From 1914 to 1915 he was director of the Ministry of Foreign Affairs. From May 1915 to 1916 he was chargé d'affaires of the Greek Ambassador to Russia in St. Petersburg, From 1919 to 1920 he was Delegate of Greece at the Council of the League of Nations. In 1920 he was second Greek Delegate at the First Session of the Assembly of League of Nations, in Geneva. From 1922 to 1923 he was Second Greek Delegate at Lausanne Peace Conference where on July 24, 1923, he signed with Eleftherios Venizelos, the Final Act of the Treaty of Lausanne. In 1926 he was First Greek Delegate at Assembly of the League of Nations, and granted on retirement by Greek Government the title of Envoy Extraordinary and Minister Plenipotentiary of First Class for Life.

== Decorations ==
- Grand Cross of the Order of George I of Greece
- He received the award of the Order of Christ the Archangel
