= Markos Theodoridis =

Greek politician

- Μάρκος Θεοδωρίδης
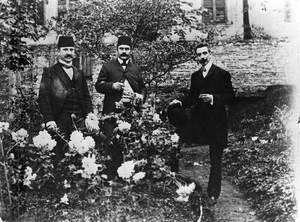
- Markos Theodoridis at the far right.
- Born: c. 1872; Serres, Salonika Vilayet, Ottoman Empire (now Greece)
- Died: 4 July 1952; Kingdom of Greece
- Spouse: Eleni Roumpen Giarmolinski
- Military career
- Allegiance: Kingdom of Greece
- Branch: HMC
- Conflicts: Macedonian Struggle
- Other work: Member of the Peoples Party; MP for Thessaloniki; Minister of Hospitalisation; Minister of Agriculture; Foreign Minister

Markos Theodoridis (Greek: Μάρκος Θεοδωρίδης, 1872 – 1952) was a Greek lawyer and politician. He served as a member of parliament for the Thessaloniki constituency and as a minister.

== Biography ==
He was born in Serres and he studied law. He worked as a lawyer. He fought in the Macedonian Struggle and cooperated with the Consul-General Koromilas and other officials. He was elected as member of parliament for Thessaloniki in 1920, 1926, 1935 and 1936, with the People's Party. He married την Eleni Roumpen Giarmolinski in 1907, a widow with four children.

He served as minister of Hospitalisation in the Gounaris government from 2 March 1922 to 3 May 1922 and in the Protopapadakis government from 9 May 1922 to 28 August 1922. In the Tsaldaris government he served as Agriculture minister from 19 July 1935 to 10 October 1935, and temporarily as Foreign minister.

He died on 4 July 1952.
