= Embassy of Greece, Moscow =

Greek Diplomatic mission in Russia

Coordinates: 55.7586°N 37.6026°E

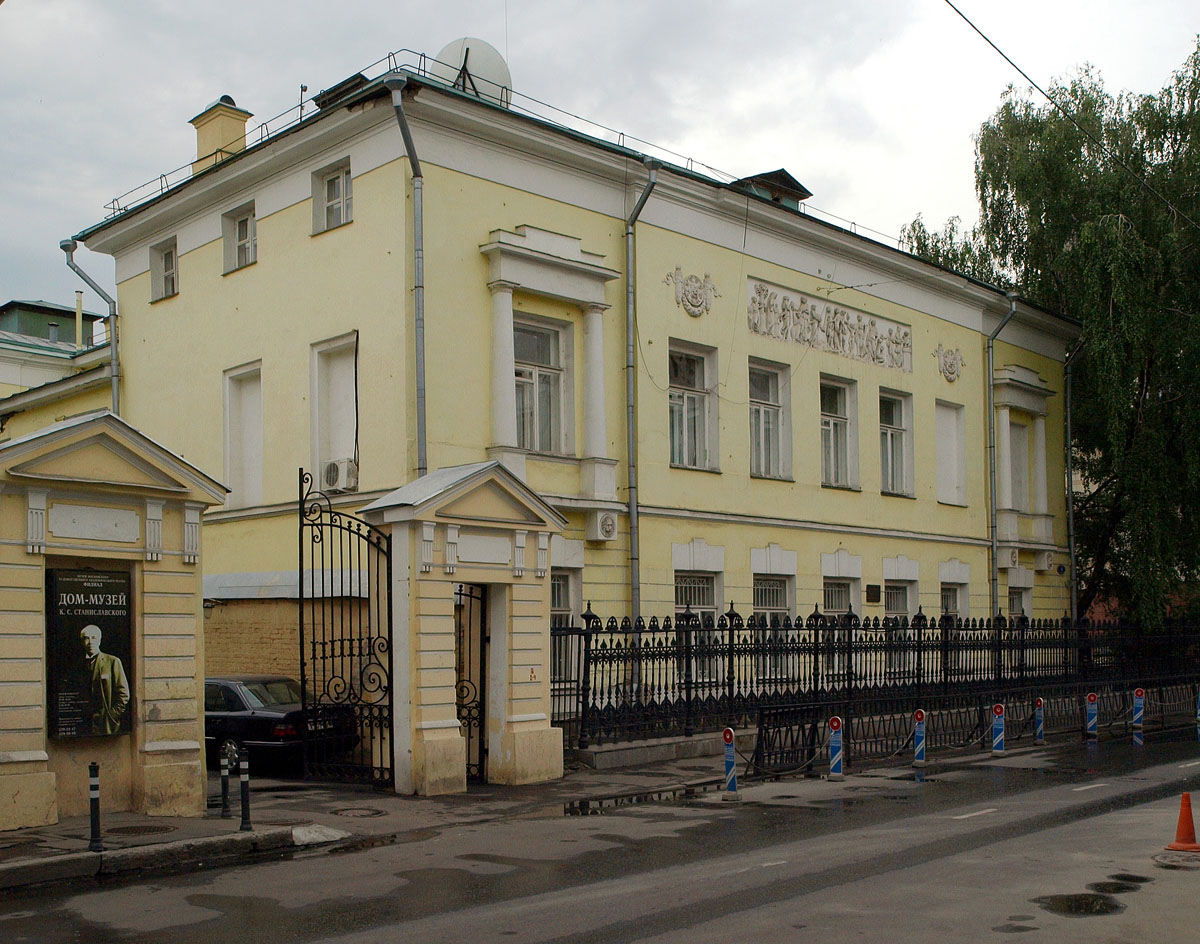
- Location: Moscow

The Embassy of the Hellenic Republic in Moscow is the chief diplomatic mission of the Hellenic Republic in the Russian Federation. It is located at 4 Leontevsky Lane (Russian: Леонтьевский пер., 4) in the Presnensky District of Moscow.

In the early 2010, the historical building that houses the Embassy underwent a thorough renovation, which was executed by the GlavUpDK.

== See also ==
- Greece–Russia relations
- Diplomatic missions in Russia
