= 1935 legislative election =

1935 legislative election may refer to:

- Greek legislative election, 1935
- Polish legislative election, 1935
