= List of ambassadors of Greece to Russia =

Coordinates: 55.7587°N 37.6020°E

Ambassador of Greece to Russia
- Греческий посланник в России
- Coat of Arms of Greece

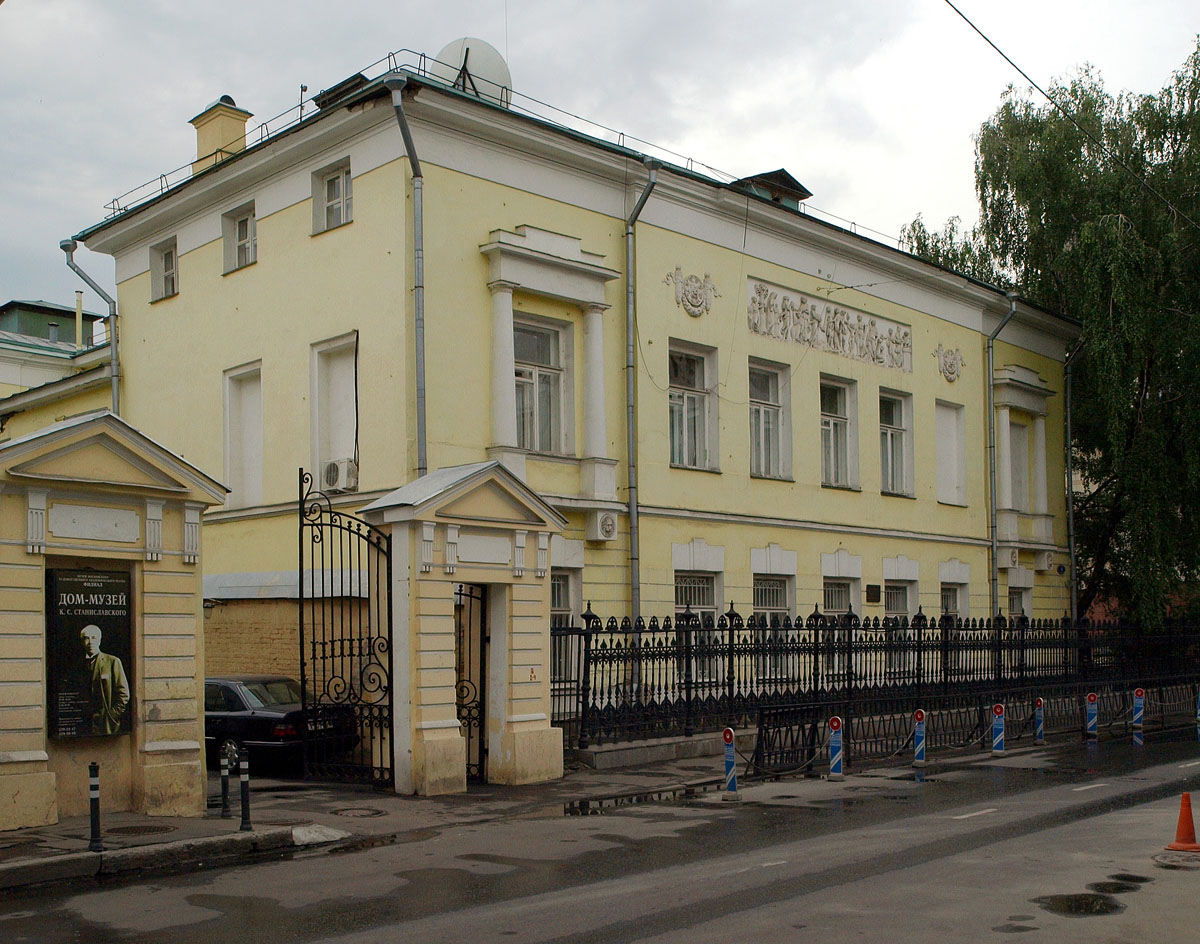
- Incumbent; Ekaterini Ksagorari
- Inaugural holder: Michael Soutzos
- Formation: 1834

The Greek Ambassador to Russia is the ambassador of the Greek government to the government of Russia.

Diplomatic accreditation	Ambassador	Greek language	Russian language	Observations	List of prime ministers of Greece	List of prime ministers of Russia	Term end
1834	Michael Soutzos	el:Μιχαήλ Σούτσος	ru:Михаил Суцу (младший)		Ioannis Kolettis	Nicholas I of Russia	
1850	Constantino Zografos	el:Κωνσταντίνος Ζωγράφος	Зографос Константинос	(* born in 1796, dies in 1856) Otto I of Greece was forced to trust in 1837 the highest political authority, Foreign Affairs, to a Greek, the then ambassador in Constantinople, Constantino Zografos. But he resigned in March 1840.	Antonios Kriezis	Nicholas I of Russia	
1855	Ioannis Soutsos	el:Ιωάννης Σούτσος	Сутсос Иоаннис	Chargé d'affaires Juan Soutsou (1804–1890) for the magazine en: To Asty 1887	Dimitrios Voulgaris	Alexander II of Russia	
July 27, 1859	Ioannis Soutsos	el:Ιωάννης Σούτσος	Сутсос Иоаннис	Ambassador	Athanasios Miaoulis	Alexander II of Russia	
1837	Andreas Metaxas	el:Ανδρέας Π. Μεταξάς	ru:Метаксас, Андреас		Alexandros Koumoundouros	Alexander II of Russia	
1869	Márkos Dragoúmis	el:Μάρκος Δραγούμης	bg:Маркос Драгумис	Chargé d'affaires	Thrasyvoulos Zaimis	Alexander II of Russia	
1871	Dimitrios Bountouris	el:Δημήτριος Μπουντούρης	Бунтурис Димитриос		Alexandros Koumoundouros	Alexander II of Russia	
1874	Petros Brailas-Armenis	el:Πέτρος Βράιλας Αρμένης	ru:Браилас-Арменис, Петрос	Petros Brailas-Armenis (Born in 1812 in Corfu; † died 1884 in London.	Dimitrios Voulgaris	Alexander II of Russia	
1875	Spyridon Markoras	Σπυρίδων Μαρκοράς	Маркорас Спиридон	Chargé d'affaires	Charilaos Trikoupis	Alexander II of Russia	
1886	Mavrokordatos Nikolaos	el:Νικόλαος Μαυροκορδάτος (1837-1903)	Маврокордатос Николаос	Mavrokordatos Nikolaos (* Trieste in 1837; † on January 31, 1903, in Athens): He was a son of Alexander Mavrokordatou and Harikleia Argyropoulou.; He studied laws in Athens and Paris.; In August 1858 he was appointed second secretary of the Greek embassy in Istanbul.; From 1866 to 1869 he was Prefect of Corfu.; He was then elected deputy with the TRIKOUPI party and served as Minister of Religious Education and public in the government Trikoupi 1878 and the government of 1880.; From 1882 to 1885 he was Greek Ambassador to France Paris.; From 1886 to 1889 he was Ambassador in Saint Petersburg.; From 1889 to 1902 he was Greek Ambassador to Turkey (Constantinople).; In 1895 he participated in the negotiations of the London agreement.; In 1897 he signed as Greece's representative peace treaty in Istanbul between Greece and Turkey.; In 1902 he resigned as re-elected deputy ambassador. In case of resignation of Alejandro Zaimis considered as predominant successor to the leadership of the TRIKOUPI party. There was also president of the association "for the dissemination of Greek letters" in the period 1871–1882.	Charilaos Trikoupis	Alexander III of Russia	
1889	Dimitrios Panas	Δημήτριος Πάνω	Панас Димитриос	Chargé d'affaires, From August 18, 1913, to December 22, 1913 he was Minister for Foreign Affairs (Greece). *March 1914: Greek Ambassador to Turkey (Sublime Porte).	Charilaos Trikoupis	Alexander III of Russia	
1916	Dimitrios Panas	Δημήτριος Πάνω	Панас Димитриос	Ambassador	Eleftherios Venizelos	Alexander Trepov	
1890	Kleon Rangavis	el:Κλέων Ρίζος Ραγκαβής	Рангавис Клеон	Kleon Rizos Rangavis (* Born on October 10, 1842, in Athens; † dies on January 20, 1917, in Nice) was a Greek scholar, dramatist and diplomat. He was the son of Alexandros Rizos Rangavis.	Charilaos Trikoupis	Alexander III of Russia	
1891	Papparigopoulos Michael	el:Μιχαήλ Παπαρρηγόπουλος	Паппаригопулос Михаил	Michael Paparrigopoulos (* 1840 in Athens; † 1920): He was first-born son of I. Paparrigopoulos.; He studied laws at LMU Munich and then returned to Greece entered the Diplomatic Career.; From 1875 to 1880: Charge d'affaires of the Greek Ambassador to Italy in Rome.; From 1891 to 1892: Minister Plenipotentiary in St. Petersburg.; In 1892 he was Greek Ambassador to Romania (Bucharest), where Evangelos Zappas dies in December 1891 and At the end of his career, he was appointed Lord Chambelán of George I of Greece.	Theodoros Deligiannis	Alexander III of Russia	
April 1892	Levidis George	Λεβίδης Γεώργιος	Левидис Георгиос	Chargé d'affaires	Konstantinos Konstantopoulos	Alexander III of Russia	
1892	Tobazis Alexander	Αλέξανδρος Τομπάζης	Томпазис Александрос	Chargé d'affaires	Konstantinos Konstantopoulos	Alexander III of Russia	
1907	Ion Dragoumis	el:Ίων Δραγούμης	ru:Драгумис, Ион	Ion Dragumis (* September 2, 1878 in Athens; † August 13, 1920 ibid): His grandfather Markos Dragoumis was a leader of the Greek Revolution.; Ion Dragoumis was one of the eleven children of Stephanos Dragoumis, who belonged to the exteriors, the Ministers of the Interior and Finance and 1910 many governments as prime minister. Dragoumis studied Laws at the University of Athens.; In 1897 he was volunteer in the Turkish-Greek war.: In 1899 he entered the diplomatic service.; He served as vice-consul in Monastir and consul in Serres, Plovdiv, Burgas and Alexandroupolis.; In 1907 he was transferred to the Embassy in Istanbul. During his stay in Alexandria he met the writer Penelope Delta, with whom a passionate love and correspondence years linked him to Dragoumis 1912, the actress Marika Kotopouli returned.; During the First Balkan War, he served as Minister of the Crown Prince and later King Constantine I in Thessaloniki.; In 1915 Dragoumis moved from the diplomatic service in politics. In the controversy between monarchists and republicans supporters of Eleftherios Venizelos, was one of the most decisive opponents of the latter. He put himself elected as a member of the Florina in the Greek Parliament. Due to disagreements with the king, who opposed the entry into the war, even after the occupation of a large part of East Macedonia by Bulgaria, shows Dragoumis 1917 had to go into exile in Corsica.; Once at Eleftherios Venizelos he was assassinated at the Gare de Lyon in Paris on August 12, 1920. Dragoumis was killed the next day by supporters of Venizelos.	Georgios Theotokis	Piotr Stolypin	
1902	George Argyropoulos	Γεώργιος Αργυρόπουλος	Аргиропулос, Георгиос		Alexandros Zaimis	Nicholas II of Russia	
1909	Nikolaos Theotokis	el:Νικόλαος Θεοτόκης	Теотокис Николаос	Chargé d'affaires, (* 1878, dies on November 15, 1922, in Goudi): Politician and diplomat, Member of Parliament of Corfu.; He was brother of Ioannis Theotokis. He studied in Athens, Paris and Berlin.; 1910-1914: Chargé d'affaires in Berlin, from 1914 to 1917 he was Greek Ambassador in Germany Berlin.; In 1920 he was elected deputy of Corfu and became Minister of Justice and military.; After the Greco-Turkish War (1919–1922) he was sentenced to death and was shot in Goudi on November 15, 1922. In 2010, at the request of Michael Protopapadaki since 2008, the grandson of the former Prime Minister Pedro Protopapadaki, was definitely dismissed by the Supreme Court the prosecution of six (including, and Nicolás María) due to the limitation.	Kyriakoulis Mavromichalis	Piotr Stolypin	
1910	Pantelis Psychas	Ψύχας Παντελής	Психас Пантелис	Chargé d'affaires Pantelis George Psycha (* 17 Mar 1874 in Marseille; † dies on October 9, 1924, in Paris)	Stefanos Dragoumis	Piotr Stolypin	
1914	John Dragoumis	Δραγούμης Ιωάννης	Драгумис Иоаннис	(1878–1920)	Eleftherios Venizelos	Iván Goremykin	
May 1915	Dimitrios Kaklamanos	el:Δημήτριος Κακλαμάνος	Какламанос Димитриос	Chargé d'affaires, Dimitrios Kaklamanos (* born in Nauplia in 1867; † dies in 1949) was a diplomat, journalist and writer and corresponding member of the Athens Academy.: Kaklamanos was director of the police newspaper in 1892 and then editor of the New Asty 1901–1907.; In 1907 he was consul in Odessa.; From 1910 to 1912 he was secretary of the Greek embassy in Paris.; From 1912 to 1914 he was Chargé d'affaires of the Greek Ambassador to Italy.; From 1915 to 1916 he was in St. Petersburg, director of the Ministry of Foreign Affairs 1914-1915 and ambassador to Washington, St. Petersburg, Stockholm and London, and a Greek representative on the board of the League of Nations. On July 24, 1923, he signed with Eleftherios Venizelos, the Final Act of the Treaty of Lausanne (Lausanne Treaty / final Praxis). He received the award of the Order of Christ the Archangel	Eleftherios Venizelos	Iván Goremykin	
June 1917	Dimitrios Kaklamanos	el:Δημήτριος Κακλαμάνος	Какламанос Димитриос	Ambassador	Eleftherios Venizelos	Knyaz Nikolai Golitsyn	
1921	Alexios Pallis	Αλέξιος Πάλλης	Паллис Алексиос		Dimitrios Gounaris	Knyaz Nikolai Golitsyn	
1924	Michael Tsamados	el:Μιχάλης Τσαμαδός	Майкл Тсамадас	January 1919: Chargé d'affaires at the Embassy of Greece, Washington, D.C.: The Greek envoy leaves for Soviet Russia. For the first time since the revolution in November 1917, Greece and Russia are once again in friendly relations. Michael Tsamados, the Greek Minister in Washington, has been chosen as the prime minister of the Greek republic to Soviet Russia. Mr. Tsamados has already left the United States to take charge of his new position. The former Greek prime minister, the United States is recognized as one of the most capable men in the diplomatic service of the European republic. The factthat has been named to shows Soviet Russia made Greece Recognizes the importance and value of having friendly relations with the Soviet Republic. Mr. Tsamados has spent several years in Germany, Macedonia, the United States, and is a great-grandson of one of the distinguished naval leaders in the Greek War of Independence. His father what the president of the Greek Boule in 1909.	Alexandros Papanastasiou	Vladimir Lenin	
1924	Mavroudes Nikolaos	el:Νικόλαος Μαυρουδής	bg:Николаос Маврудис	(* Born in 1873; † Died in 1942) was a Greek diplomat and activist in the Macedonian struggle. He was appointed first proconsul the Greek consulate in Kavala and supported parallel Greek propaganda in the region. Together with Metropolitano Crisóstomo, Teatro and Stilyanos Mavromichalis organize Greek propaganda in the regions of Drama and rules. From 1910 to 1911, the Greek consul in Bitola. 1930 ambassador in Rome. Acts as Secretary General of the Ministry of Foreign Affairs of Greece in Panagis Tsaldaris. From 7 to March 10, 1933: Minister of Foreign Affairs, only to renounce all government, on this day.	Alexandros Papanastasiou	Alekséi Rýkov	
1925	Lagoudakis George	Γεώργιος Λαγουδάκη	Лагудакис Георгиос		Theodoros Pangalos (general)	Alekséi Rýkov	
1926	Panouriás Nákos	Νάκος Πανουριά	Пануриас Накос		Eleftherios Venizelos	Alekséi Rýkov	
1929	Anisás Nikólaos	Νικόλαος Ανισά	Анисас Николаос	Chargé d'affaires	Eleftherios Venizelos	Alekséi Rýkov	
August 14, 1930	Psarouda Constantino	Κωνσταντίνος Ψαρούδα	Псарудас Константинос	From November 2, 1918 he was Consul General in New York City.; From 1920 to 1922 he was Greek Ambassador to Italy.; From 1926 to 1927 he was Greek Ambassador to the Czech Republic; From August 14, 1930 to 1933 he was Ambassador in Moscow.	Eleftherios Venizelos	Viacheslav Molotov	
1933	Polychroniadis Spyridon	Σπυρίδων Πολυχρονιάδη	Полихрониадис Спиридон		Panagis Tsaldaris	Viacheslav Molotov	
1935	Stephen John	Ιωάννης Στεφάνο	Стефану Иоаннис	Chargé d'affaires	Georgios Kondylis	Viacheslav Molotov	
1936	Jean Pappas	Ιωάννης Παππά	Паппас Иоаннис		Ioannis Metaxas	Viacheslav Molotov	
July 1937	Jean Kindynis	Ιωάννης Κινδύνη	Киндинис Иоаннис	(* ~ 1900) he has served in the United Kingdom, France, Turkey, Hungary, the Soviet Union and Sweden.: 1938: Charge d'affaires in Stockholm.; 1949: extraordinary envoy and plenipotentiary in Vienna.; autumn 1952: Manager of the Greek delegation to the 6th Session of the UN General Assembly in New York.; 1955: John Kindynis was appointed Greek Ambassador to Sweden in Stockholm and the other Scandinavian states in place of Dimitrios Georgios Argyropoulos who has been appointed Greek Ambassador to Brazil in Rio de Janeiro in succession to Georgios Sambelis, who has been appointed Greek Ambassador to South Africa in Pretoria.	Ioannis Metaxas	Viacheslav Molotov	
January 1938	Nikolopoulos Dimitrios	Δημήτριος Νικολόπουλο	Димитриос Николопулос		Ioannis Metaxas	Viacheslav Molotov	
1938	Spyridon Mercados	Σπυρίδων Μαρκέτη	Маркетис Спиридон		Ioannis Metaxas	Viacheslav Molotov	
1940	Christophe Diamantopoulos	Χρήστος Διαμαντόπουλο	Диамантопулос Христос		Ioannis Metaxas	Viacheslav Molotov	
1941	Panagiotis Pipinelis	Παναγιώτης Πιπινέλη	Пипинелис Панагиотис		Georgios Tsolakoglou	Joseph Stalin	
1942	Constantino Sourlas	Κωνσταντίνος Σούρλα	Сурлас Константинос	Chargé d'affaires	Konstantinos Logothetopoulos	Joseph Stalin	
1943	Athanase George Politis	Αθανάσιος Πολίτη	Политис Афанасиос		Ioannis Rallis	Joseph Stalin	
1947	Basilio Neophytos	Βασίλειος Νεόφυτο	Неофитос Василиос		Dimitrios Maximos	Joseph Stalin	
1948	Alexander Sgourdaios	Αλέξανδρος Σγουρδαίο	СгурдЭос Александрос	Chargé d'affaires	Themistoklis Sofoulis	Joseph Stalin	
1964	Alexander Sgourdaios	Αλέξανδρος Σγουρδαίο	СГУРДЭОС Александрос	Ambassador	Georgios Papandreou	Alexei Kosygin	
1951	Thomas Ypsilanti	Θωμάς Υψηλάντη	Ипсилантис Фомас	Chargé d'affaires	Nikolaos Plastiras	Joseph Stalin	
1953	Kountoumas Alexander	Αλέξανδρος Κουντουμά	Кунтумас Александрос		Alexandros Papagos	Georgi Malenkov	
1956	Cheimarios Constantino	Κωνσταντίνος Χειμαριό	Химариос Константинос	Chargé d'affaires	Konstantinos Karamanlis	Nikolai Bulganin	
1957	Dimitrios Pappas	Δημήτριος Παππά	Паппас Димитриос		Konstantinos Karamanlis	Nikolai Bulganin	
March 15, 1960	Kapsampeli George	Γεώργιος Καψαμπέλη	Капсампелис Георгиос	Chargé d'affaires	Konstantinos Karamanlis	Nikita Khrushchev	
1960	George Christopoulos	Γεώργιος Χριστόπουλο	Христопулос Георгиос		Konstantinos Karamanlis	Nikita Khrushchev	
1963	Tzounis John	Ιωάννης Τζούνη	Тзунис Иоаннис	Chargé d'affaires	Konstantinos Karamanlis	Nikita Khrushchev	
1965	Varsamis George	Γεώργιος Βαρσάμη	Варсамис Георгиос		Georgios Papandreou	Alexei Kosygin	
1967	Constantin Tsamados	Κωνσταντίνος Τσαμαδό	Тсамадос Константинос	Chargé d'affaires	Konstantinos Kollias	Alexei Kosygin	
1968	Angelos Vlachos	Άγγελος Βλάχο	Влахос Ангелос		Georgios Papadopoulos	Alexei Kosygin	
1972	Alexander Dimitropoulos	Αλέξανδρος Δημητρόπουλο	Димитропулос Александрос		Georgios Papadopoulos	Alexei Kosygin	
1976	Kalogeras Pedro	Πέτρος Καλογερά	Калогерас Петрос		Konstantinos Karamanlis	Alexei Kosygin	
November 9, 1979	Botsaris Timoleón-Notis	Τιμολέων-Νότης Μπότσαρη	Мпотсарис Тимолеон-Нотис	Chargé d'affaires	Konstantinos Karamanlis	Alexei Kosygin	
1979	Metaxás Andréas	Ανδρέας Μεταξά	Метаксас, Андреас		Konstantinos Karamanlis	Alexei Kosygin	
1984	Ioannis Grigoriadis	Ιωάννης Γρηγοριάδη	Григориадис Иоаннис		Andreas Papandreou	Nikolai Tíjonov	
1987	Dountas Michael	Μιχαήλ Δούντα	Дунтас Михаил		Andreas Papandreou	Mikhail Gorbachev	
1988	Sandis Aristides	Αριστείδης Σάνδη	Сандис Аристидис	Chargé d'affaires	Andreas Papandreou	Mikhail Gorbachev	
1989	Elias Gounaris	Ηλίας Γούναρη	Гунарис Илиас		Tzannis Tzannetakis	Mikhail Gorbachev	
1993	Lymperopoylos Constantino	Κωνσταντίνος Λυμπερόπουλο	Либеропулос Константинос		Andreas Papandreou	Víktor Chernomyrdin	
1994	Rodousakis Kyriakos	Κυριάκος Ροδουσάκη	Родусакис Кириакос		Andreas Papandreou	Víktor Chernomyrdin	
1997	Dimitrios Kypreos	Δημήτριος Κυπραίο	Кипреос Димитриос		Costas Simitis	Víktor Chernomyrdin	
2002	Dimitrios Paraskevopoulos	Δημήτριος Παρασκευόπουλο	Параскевопулос Димитриос		Costas Simitis	Mikhail Kasyanov	
2005	Elias Klis	Ηλίας Κλή	Клис Илиас	(*1946 in Athens) He graduated from the Faculty of Law of the University of Athens. Since 1973 - the diplomatic service in the Greek Ministry of Foreign Affairs. In particular, he worked in the rank of consul or ambassador of Greece in different countries. In addition, as the EU coordinator, dealing with issues of terrorism, immigration and free movement of citizens. Represented Greece in negotiations on accession to the Schengen Agreement. He speaks English, French and Romanian. Married, wife - Ersi Klis. It has the following awards: Grand Commander of the Order of the Phoenix (Greece); Grand Commander of the Order "For Merit" (France); Grand Commander of the Royal Order "For Merit" (Norway).	Kostas Karamanlis	Mikhail Fradkov	
February 27, 2009	Michael Spinellis	Μιχαήλ Σπινέλλης	ru:Спинеллис, Михаил	*On 27 February 2009 Mikhail Spinellis presented his credential letter as Ambassador Extraordinary and Plenipotentiary of the Hellenic Republic in the Russian Federation, to Dmitri Medvedev. Mikhail Spinellis (* March 26, 1953 in Athens).: He is married and he has a daughter.; In 1975 he graduated from the Faculty of Laws and Economics of the Aristotle University of Thessaloniki.; From 1976 to 1977 he served in the army.; In 1979 he entered the diplomatic service.; 1987: was Secretary of Embassy, Permanent Mission, Geneva.; From February 15, 1993 until June 9, 1996 was Chargé d'affaires of the Greek Ambassador to Serbia (Belgrade).; 1996: Counselor at the Embassy in London.; From March 30, 2000 until June 9, 2005 was Greek Ambassador to Serbia in Belgrade.; From 2008 to 2013 he was ambassador in Moscow and was simultaneously accredited in Tajikistan.	Kostas Karamanlis	Vladimir Putin	
October 23, 2013	Danae Magdalini Koumanakou	Δανάη-Μαγδαληνή Κουμανάκου	bg:Данаи-Магдалини Куманаку	On October 23, 2013 Danae Magdalini Koumanakou presented her credential letter as Ambassador Extraordinary and Plenipotentiary of the Hellenic Republic in the Russian Federation, to Vladimir Putin. Danae Magdalini Koumanakou (* 1954 in Athenes): From 2006 to 2013 she was Greek Ambassador in Bulgaria Sofia.; She holds a degree in Sociology and Political Sciences from the University of Paris.	Antonis Samaras	Dmitri Medvedev	

- Greece–Russia relations
