= List of ambassadors of Greece to Italy =

Coordinates: 41.919952°N 12.490805°E

Ambassador of Greece to Italy
- Ambasciatrice di Grecia in Italia
- Coat of Arms of Greece
- Incumbent; Theodore Μ. Passas since 2019
- Inaugural holder: Dimitrios Kallergis
- Formation: 1861

The Greek Ambassador to Italy is the Ambassador of the Greek government to the government of Italy.

- For Greece, Italy is the first commercial partner and Greece receives major Italian investments.

Diplomatic accreditation	Ambassador	Greek language	Observations	List of prime ministers of Greece	List of prime ministers of Italy	Term end
1861	Dimitrios Kallergis	el:Δημήτριος Καλλέργης	Turin	Athanasios Miaoulis	Bettino Ricasoli	
1861	Fokion Rok	Φωκίωνα Ροκ	Turin	Athanasios Miaoulis	Bettino Ricasoli	
1867	Andreas G. Kountouriotis	Ανδρέας Γεώργιος Κουντουριώτης	Florence, (1820-1895): studied Laws at the University of Paris and was appointed to a post in the Ministry of Foreign Affairs.; He was elected parliamentary deputy for Hydra, became Foreign Minister in the government of Athanasios Miaoulis, and later Ambassador of Greece to Constantinople.	Alexandros Koumoundouros	Urbano Rattazzi	
1880	Georgios Mavrokordatos	el:Γεώργιος Μαυροκορδάτος	Rome: He was one of the first professors of the university.: From 1837 to 1858 he taught at the Law School of the University of Ottoman Studies.; Had been Ambassador to Rome in the period 1876–1880.	Charilaos Trikoupis	Benedetto Cairoli	
1881	M.I.Paparrigopoulos	M. Ιωάννης Παπαρρηγόπουλος		Alexandros Koumoundouros	Agostino Depretis	
1882	Demetrios Razis	Δημήτριος Ραζής	(*died before 1914): Was Chief Dragoman of the Greek Embassy at Constantinople in the times of Mehmed Emin Âli Pasha.	Charilaos Trikoupis	Agostino Depretis	
1889	Anastasios Vyzantios	el:Αναστάσιος Βυζάντιος		Charilaos Trikoupis	Francesco Crispi	
1902	Ioannis Gryparis (1848-1922)	el:Ιωάννης Γρυπάρης (πολιτικός)		Alexandros Zaimis	Giuseppe Zanardelli	
1908	Dimitris G. Metaxas (1858)	Δημήτριος Μεταξάς	(* March 14, 1858 Syra) Educ. Athens. D.L. Hon.: 1890 Chargé d'affaires of the Greek Ambassador to Germany Berlin.; 1892 Greek Ambassador in Serbia Belgrade.; From 1895 to 1908 he was Greek Ambassador to the United Kingdom London.; and later in Rome twice until 1922. The Family of Metaxas	Georgios Theotokis	Sidney Sonnino	
1913	Lambros Koromilas	el:Λάμπρος Κορομηλάς		Eleftherios Venizelos	Giovanni Giolitti	
1920	Konstantinos Psaroudas	Κωνσταντίνος Ψαρούδας	From November 2, 1918 he was Consul General in New York.; From 1926 to 1927 he was Greek Ambassador to the Czech Republic; From August 14, 1930 to 1933 he was Greek Ambassador to Russia	Dimitrios Rallis	Francesco Saverio Nitti	
1925	Nikolaos Mavroudis	Νικόλαος Μαυρουδής	(*1873 - 1942): From March 7, 1933, to March 10, 1933, he was Minister for Foreign Affairs (Greece) in the transitional government of Alexandros Othonaios.; he had the longest term of office in the post of State Secretary of State.; He studied laws at the University of Athens; In 1901 he entered the diplomatic service.; He served as Greek Ambassador to Belgrade, Moscow and Rome.; In 1930 he was appointed general manager of the Foreign Ministry Subsequently, after the appointment of the Permanent Secretary of State to the Ministry of Foreign Affairs, according to the forced law 43 of 1936, N. Mavroudis was the first to be appointed to this post and performed the relevant duties throughout the duration of the 4th of August Regime until the invasion of the Germans in Greece.; A career diplomat appointed in turn to the Greek embassies in Belgrade, Warsaw and Moscow, and later in Rome.; In 1940 as the Greek Deputy Minister for Foreign Affairs, he observed: 'There are a lot of Germanophiles here, and a lot of Anglophiles, and many who care neither for Germany nor England in particular, but there are no Italophiles in Greece.	Theodoros Pangalos (general)	Benito Mussolini	
1930	Petros Metaxas	Πέτρος Μεταξάς	Pierre-A. Metaxas was from April 4, 1940 to May 9, 1946 Greek Ambassador to France and head of the Political Bureau of George II of Greece.	Eleftherios Venizelos	Benito Mussolini	
1940	Ioannis Politis (1890-1959)	el:Ιωάννης Πολίτης (υπουργός)	John Politis was from August 8 to October 27, 1951 Minister for Foreign Affairs (Greece).: The Ioannis Politis Archive (Ioannis Politis was a prominent leading diplomat and permanent Under Secretary of State in 1950–1951), which is deposited in the Benaki Museum.	Ioannis Metaxas	Benito Mussolini	
1944	Georgios Exintaris	el:Γεώργιος Εξηντάρης	Georgios Exintaris was a politician and diplomat.	Georgios Papandreou	Pietro Badoglio	
December 1947	Dimitrios Apostolos Kapsalis	Δημήτριος Καψάλης	(* 1894 at Athens): Father's name, Christos. Married, one child.; Studies : Law at the University of Athens.; Jan. 1917 Attache at the Ministry of Foreign Affairs.; March 1919 Second Secretary at Embassy in Bucharest.; June 1921 to November 1921 to Embassy in Brussels.; January 1923 promoted 1st Secretary.; April 1923 sent to Consulate-General at Geneva.; February 1924 transferred to Consulate-General at Istanbul.; November 1925 Department Head B., and; January 1926 sent to Embassy in Rome.; December 1929 recalled to Ministry.; May 1931 Department Head A.; Nov. 1932 to 1935 he was Consul General to Istanbul.; September 1933 promoted to Director B.; in June 1935 to Director A.; From November 1937 to October 1944 he was Greek Ambassador to Egypt Cairo.; From October 1944 to November 1945 he was Minister to the exiled Norwegian, Czechoslovak and Dutch Governments in London.; In June 1946 he was promoted to Minister Plenipotentiary A.; In December 1947 he became Ambassador in Rome.; From October 1950 to April 1954 he was Greek Ambassador to Belgium.; Decorations : Grand Cross of the Phoenix, Silver Cross of the Saviour.	Dimitrios Maximos	Ferruccio Parri	
1950	Georgios Exintaris	el:Γεώργιος Εξηντάρης		Nikolaos Plastiras	Ferruccio Parri	
1952	Alexander Argyropoulos	el:Αλέξανδρος Αργυρόπουλος		Alexandros Papagos	Ferruccio Parri	
1957	Cleon Syndika	Κλεον Συϊντικα		Konstantinos Karamanlis	Adone Zoli	
1962	Nikolaos Hatzivassiliou	Νικόλαος Χατζηβασιλείου	In 1956 during the Suez Crisis he was head of the Middle Eastern Affairs section of the Foreign Ministry.	Konstantinos Karamanlis	Fernando Tambroni	
1965	Antonios Poumbouras	Αντώνιος Πούμπουρας		Georgios Papandreou	Giovanni Leone	
1972	Stefanos Rokanas	Στέφανον Ροκανάς	1960: Consul General of Chicago	Georgios Papadopoulos	Giulio Andreotti	
1974	Ioannis Koliakopoulos	Ιωάννης Κολιακόπουλος		Adamantios Androutsopoulos	Aldo Moro	
1977	Yiangos Pesmazoglou	Γιάγκος Πεσμαζόγλου	(*March 1, 1918 in Chios)	Konstantinos Karamanlis	Giulio Andreotti	
1982	Christos Stremmenos	Χρήστος Στρεμμένος		Andreas Papandreou	Amintore Fanfani	
1987	Nikolaos Athanassiou	Νικόλαος Αθανασίου		Andreas Papandreou	Amintore Fanfani	
1990	Konstantinos Georgiou	Κωνσταντίνος Γεωργίου		Konstantinos Mitsotakis	Giulio Andreotti	
1994	Evangelos Frangoulis	Ευάγγελος Φραγκούλης	(* 15 May 1936 in Kalamata) son of Philippos Frangoulis; married, Education: studied laws at the University of Athens, international relations at the London School of Economics.: Embassy Attache, Ministry of Foreign Affairs 1963.; Embassy Secretary, London 1965.; The Hague 1965.; Embassy Counsellor, Geneva 1974.; Sofia 1976.; Rome 1979.; In 1982 he became Greek Ambassador in Sudan, Khartoum.; In 1985 he became Greek Ambassador in Algeria, Algiers.; In 1987 he became Head of Greek Delegation to Mutual and Balanced Force Reductions, Vienna.; In 1994 he became ambassador in Rome.	Andreas Papandreou	Silvio Berlusconi	
1997	Alexandros Sandis	Αλέξανδρος Σάνδης		Costas Simitis	Romano Prodi	
2000	Gerokostopoulos Konstantinos	Κωνσταντίνος Γεροκωστόπουλος		Costas Simitis	Giuliano Amato	
2004	Anastasios Mitsialis	Αναστάσιος Μητσιάλης		Kostas Karamanlis	Silvio Berlusconi	
2007	Charalambos Rokanas	Χαράλαμπος Ροκανάς		Kostas Karamanlis	Romano Prodi	
2010	Michael Cambanis	Μιχαήλ Καμπάνης		George Papandreou	Silvio Berlusconi	
2013	Themistoklis Demiris	Θεμιστοκλής Δεμίρης		Antonis Samaras	Enrico Letta	2017
December 5, 2017	Tasia Athanasiou	Τασιά Αθανασίου	(*September 1, 1960 in Patras): 2007 First Counsellor next to the Holy See.; From 2009 to 2011 she was Greek Ambassador to Syria.; From 2012 to 2017 she was Greek Ambassador to Poland.	Alexis Tsipras	Paolo Gentiloni	2022
May 12, 2022	Eleni Sourani	Ελένη Σουράνη	2013-2016: Ambassador of Greece to the Kingdom of Denmark; 2016-2019: Ambassador of Greece to Albania; 2019: Director of the Directorate for Relations with Turkey; 2020-2022 Director of the Diplomatic Cabinet of the Prime Minister of the Hellenic Republic	Konstantinos Tasoulas	Sergio Mattarella	

- Greek–Italian relations
