= Armenis (family) =

Armenis (Greek: Αρμένης, Armēnēs), in Italian and older English literature Armeni, is a Greek family from Corfu. The Armeni family is an ancient Byzantine-, and later Greco-Venetian gens that produced many important individuals in the history of Europe. With origins in Byzantium, the family achieved levels of wealth and prominence over the centuries in branches found across the territories of modern Greece and Italy. The Armeni are listed in numerous registers of nobility, including Teatro della Nobiltà dell'Europa, ovvero notizia delle famiglie nobili, che in Europa vivono di presente, e che in lei vissero prima (1725), Origine de' cognomi gentilizi nel Regno di Napoli (1756), Dictionnaire Historique et Généalogique des Grandes Familles de Grèce, d'Albanie et de Constantinople (1983), Livre d'Or de la Noblesse Ionienne (1925), and La Dalmazia Giornale Letterario Economico Inteso Agli Interessi Della Provincia, Volume 2 (1846), among others.

== History ==
=== Crete ===
In 961 C.E., the Mediterranean island of Crete, which had been under Muslim rule for almost 150 years, was restored to the Byzantine Empire under the leadership of general-, and future emperor, Nikephoros Phokas. Legend provides that the Byzantine emperor sent 12 noble families from Constantinople, known as the archondopoula, to rule the island of Crete as archons. Of the reconquest of Crete, Andrea Corner's (b. 1547 - d. ca. 1616) Storia di Candia, is the first literary work to deal exclusively with the island's history. Similarly, in Revue de l'Orient Latin, Vol. 11 (1908), Louis-Ernest Leroux provides further context in the following passage:

Thus, [ Nikephoros Phokas ] subdued and ransacked the whole island, which for 142 years had been occupied and lorded by barbarians, and he had it settled and left in the form of a colony, for its greater security, under noble families originally from Constantinople [nobili Costantinopolitani] of the Màggiori and of the Senatorial order, namely: the Armeni; the Caleteri; the Anatolici, also called Cortezzi; the Cargenti, that is, Saturnini; the Vespesiani, also called Melissini; [...] the Sutili; the Papiliani, also called Vlasti; the Romuli, also called Claudi; the Aliotti, also called Scordilli; the Colonessi, also called Coloini; the Irtini, also called Arculendi; and the Phoca, of the same blood of the Phoca from whom the noble house of Calergi originated.

According to Trivan (1644) the Armeni family belonged to the bourgeoisie that encompassed the noble class descended from the twelve Senatorial Houses of Constantinople and those noble Venetian families whose titles had lapsed, all citizens of Crete, most of whom were from the original inhabitants of the Metropolitan city of Heraklion.

=== County of Avellino ===
The Angevins ruled Corfu from 1267 to 1386. Charles I d'Anjou imposed a new form of rule on Corfu. He appointed a Regent as his representative, and divided the island into four administrative regions. The administrator of each region was called the Bailo and the large estates, the “feuds” (timária), were ceded to barons from Provence and Italy.

==== Provence ====
The Armeni family held the lordship of Orgon and Noves. In 1175 Guillaume Arméni de Noves had his seigniorial rights confirmed in an Act signed by Geoffrey II, bishop of Avignon. His son Aldebert held the first rank in Noves and was appointed Judge of Avignon from 1190 and later Judge, Assessor & Chancellor of the Counts of Toulouse in the county of Provence from 1200 until 1222.

==== Avellino ====
The Armeni family established itself in the Province of Avellino during the reign of Charles I d'Anjou. The family married into the Montfort family during the time that Simon d'Montfort was awarded the lordship of Avellino by Charles I d'Anjou and the family changed its name to Armenius de Montforte (also d'Arminio Montforte). On 9 September 1272 Iohannis Armeni was appointed the new castellan of the Castle of Capua. He was also known as Jean Jacques Armenius de Montforte from Avellino.

== Synonyms and aliases ==
=== Crete ===
Trivan (1644) listed the Armeni family in the city of Chania as members of the bourgeoisie and added that the name was also written as Armuri (Armeri from d'Armer, also Darmer). Trivan (1644) lists the Darmer family of the same city [Chania] separately as a Venetian noble house with a footnote stating that the Armeni name is also noted as Armuri in the original text. Another example of this practice can be found in the Cretan aristocratic family Kallergis known to have descended from the Phokas family on Crete.

After the occupation by the Franks, the Latin church on Crete was administered by the diocese of Agiensis, which later became known as Cydonia. Le Quien (III, 923-928) knew of sixteen Latin bishops, from 1310 to 1645. The Republic of Venice rebuilt and fortified Chania in 1252, until it was finally taken by the Ottoman Empire in 1645.

In 1642, Georgium D. Armenium (also Giorgio Darminio and Giorgio Darmiro), was canon and plenipotentiary to the secretary of the Roman Catholic Church on Crete. An ex-resident of Cydonia and canon of the church of Agiensis in Chania, he became the Bishop of the Roman Catholic Diocese of Caprulenses (Caorle - Metropolitan City of Venice) from 1649 to 1655 and the Bishop of Aemoniensis (today Ljubljana, capital of Slovenia) from 1655 to 1670.

=== Corfu ===
On the island of Corfu in 1406 C.E. the barony of the count of Martina (Baronia del Conte de Martina) belonged to Vito Darmer who established the settlement of Armenades. The Armer on Corfu belonged to the new noble class of Venice. Aloysius Armenus, also known as Luigi Armeno and Alvise Darmer, was the Provveditore (1502) and the Bailo of Corfu (1512). In 1499 C.E. his brother Albano Armenio died bravely during the naval battle of Zochio against the Ottomans. The naval battle of Zochio is noted as the first naval battle in history where gunpowder determined the outcome of the naval battle. His warship was named the Santa Barbara, who would later become the patron saint of artillery.

=== Milos ===
Dr. Ben J. Slot (1982) provides the nomination of Ioannis Armenis on 9 November 1589 as French Consul on the island of Milos as:

Acte de nomination d'Armeni ("Jean Darmer") dans: Marseille.

== Notable family members ==
- George Armenis (b.18.10.1943 Klimatia, Ioannina) one of the best-known and respected actors in classical theater.
- Countess Eleni Armeni-Mocenigo (b.1780 Corfu) (+1840 Padova, Veneto) daughter of Dr. Ioannis Armenis from Corfu and Regina Falier from Venice. She was married to Count Giorgio Mocenigo, the Commissioner of Internal Affairs for the Empress of Russia, Catherine the Great, at the Grand Dutchy of Tuscany and the Commissioner of the Septinsular Republic and Russia's Imperial Representative to the Ionian Islands. Countess Elena established a fund for the maintenance and care of orphaned children of Greek descent in Italy. The countess donated 10,000 Italian pounds in favour of the Flanginian School in Venice. She donated 30,000 Italian pounds to the Greek Cathedral of St. George in Venice. She also donated 1,000,000 Austrian pounds to her hometown of Corfu for Swiss scholarships for needy young people and provided the funds needed to care for brides from Corfu who could not afford dowries.
- Rev. Dr. Giovanni Armeni (*1731 Corfu) (†13.12.1796 Corfu) was the son of Nicoletto Armeni and Francesca Gatto da Piacenza. He was the Roman Catholic priest and rector of the Cathedral of Saint James and Saint Christopher in Corfu Town.
- Dr. Ioannis Armenis (*1753 Potamos, Corfu) (†3.8.1837 Potamos, Corfu) son of Dr. Demetrios Armenis and Marinetta Quartano. He was a Doctor of Law and served as a Senator, a secretary of the Senate, a member of Onoranda Deputazione (11.11.1801), a chairman of the committee on the establishment of the Public Library, and represented the Ionian Senate in negotiations with Ali Pasha concerning the clarification of territorial borders.
- Captain Leonardo Armeni from Corfu was a commander of a Venetian ship of war and the son of Captain Ioannis Armenis. He married Maria the daughter of Captain Antonio Tarakouli on 15 April 1744 in Venice. They had two sons that served as naval commanders, Antonio and Zuane.
- Captain Zuane Armeni, a nobleman from Corfu and commander of the Venetian warship San Giorgio assigned to the Armata Grossa stationed at Corfu (30.6.1786 - 12.5.1797). He first married Vasiliki, the daughter of Apostolo Loverdo and secondly Caterina, the daughter of Captain Alessandro Mormori.
- Sir Antonio Armeni (*1756 Potamos, Corfu) (†2.10.1824 Venice), commanded the Venetian fleet and later the Imperial Austrian Navy in the Levant. He was awarded the Order of St. Anne 2nd Class, the Order of Saints Maurice and Lazarus, and the Austrian Order of Emperor Leopold 1st Class.
- Dr. Karolo Armeni (*1772 Corfu) (†4.11.1847 Corfu) son of Dr. Pietro Antonio Armeni and Massimiliani Tefa. He was a medical doctor and surgeon as well as a founding member of the Medical Association of Greece, a candidate elect for the Legislative Assembly of the Ionian Senate, an author and the family physician of Count Ioannis Kapodistrias, the 1st Governor of Independent Greece.
- Joachim Armenis (born Ioannis Armenis) served as a Greek Orthodox Monastic and Priest (1716 - 1743) and was ordained Bishop of Koroni in the Peloponnese (Venetian Administration).
- Dr. Demetrios Armenis (*1729 Potamos, Corfu) (†5.4.1817 Potamos, Corfu) was the son of Giannakis Armenis and Anastasia Mourmouraki. He studied at the Flanginian School in Venice (29.9.1745) and graduated from the School of Law at the University of Padua. He was a Doctor of Law and served as a senator and a member of the Onoranda Deputazione (21.10.1801 Corfu). In addition, he was a member of the first administration for the establishment of a public education system in the Septinsular Republic.
- Antonios Armenis (*1776 Corfu) (†2.2.1844 Corfu) was the son of Dr. Pietro Antonio Armeni and Massimiliani Tefa. He acquired great wealth and land in central and southern Corfu from the management of the Tron Barony. He was commissioned by the Ionian Senate to oversee the finances of the island of Lefkada and served as financier of Count Ioannis Kapodistrias.
- Sir Petros Brailas Armenis was born on 10 December 1812 on Corfu and died in 1884 in London. He was the son of Demetrios Brailas of Vonitsa and Anna Angiola Armeni from Corfu. He was a judge, a professor of philosophy at the Ionian Academy, president of the Legislative Assembly of the Ionian Islands and he served as ambassador of Greece at St. Petersburg, Paris and London. In addition, he was the founder of the Corfu Reading Society, he established the National Archives on Corfu and established the free press in Greece by creating the first two independent newspapers on Corfu. He was awarded the Knight's Grand Cross of the Order of St. Michael and St. George (GCMG).
- Peter Armeni, the son of Gregorius from Heraklion, was ennobled by the Holy Roman Emperor from the House of Habsburg in 1601. He was a Wallachian boyar who served Michael the Brave as negotiator with the Polish king. He was the ambassador for the Habsburg Empire at Constantinople and was an acclaimed financier who assisted the Holy Roman Emperor Rudolph II.
- Iohannis Armeni (1521-1574) was the Voivode of Moldavia from 1572 to 1574. He was one of the last Romanian rulers to battle the Turks. His short reign was marked by fierce combat against the Ottoman Empire and their Crimean Tatar allies. In order to counter the power of the Ottomans, he allied himself to the Ukrainian Cossacks. He was victorious at Brăila, Tighina and Cetatea Alba.
- Sir Petri Armeni from Heraklion was victorious in a dueling contest with Sir Liadari Zorzi on 1 July 1547.
- Mastro Stefanos Armenis from Heraklion was a noted master iconographer and painter from 1549 to 1568.
- Dr. Markos Armenis from Crete was a Doctor of Law from the University of Padua and was one of only ten advocates on the island of Crete in 1564.
- Nicolai Armeni was a Wallachia nobleman, an interpreter, adviser and member of the Polish delegation that traveled to Constantinople in 1541. In 1562 Emperor Sigismund II noted him as an honoured lord who was leader of a Wallachian delegation sent to Poland to procure supplies.
- Michiel Armeni, the son of Georgio Armeni from Crete, was a registered merchant in the city of Venice from 1635 to 1643.
- Captain Nikolaos Armenis from Kimolos was the commander of the Giove Fulminante, one of the largest warships in the Venetian Navy in 1667.

== Y-DNA Lineage ==
The paternal haplogroup associated with this family is R1b-L2. The terminal SNP for this branch of R1b-L2 is FGC13631 and the 12-marker short tandem repeat values for this SNP are as follows:

13, 24, 14, 11, 11-14/15, 12, 12, 12, 14, 13, 30

== Coats of Arms ==
=== Crete ===
Sturdza (1983) lists the Armeni family as a noble family from the island of Crete emblazoned on the walls of the University of Padua library located in the Bo Palace.

Armeni crest from Heraklion, Crete: Gules, to the crane in her vigilance Argent, supported of a coronet Or, set on a hillock Vert, the field chape-embowed Azure, 2 affrontee griffins Or, supporting a Lorraine cross together of the same. Crowned Helmet. Crest: a vol of 2 wings endorsed Gules, charged of a crane in her vigilance Argent. Lambrequins: in dexter Or and Azure, in sinister Argent, and Gules.
