= Alexander Argyropoulos =

Greek ambassador (1883–1962)

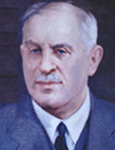

Alexander G. Argyropoulos (1883–1962) was a Greek ambassador. Born in London, he was the son of the Greek ambassador to the United Kingdom. He trained as an agricultural engineer. In his spare time he was a noted philatelist. From 1952 to 1956, he was Greek Ambassador to Italy.

== Philately ==
Argyropoulos was largely responsible for the Greek section of the Kohl Briefmarken-Handbuch. He was joint-editor of Philotelia from 1953 and an early member of the Hellenic Philotelic Society as well as a member of the Royal Philatelic Society London. He was added to the Roll of Distinguished Philatelists in 1954. He won the Grand Prix International for most outstanding exhibit in the Class of Honour at the STOCKHOLMIA 55 stamp exhibition for his display of the first Greek stamps.
