= Russians in Greece =

The Russian community in Greece are ethnic Russians living in Greece, and not the Greeks in Russia who immigrated to Greece in the 1990s.

There are 13,635 people of Russian origin living in Greece. Mostly in Athens, Thessaloniki and Crete. A small part came in the 1920s after the Russian Civil War, however the majority emigrated in the 1990s or later and consists mainly of professionals or business people operating in many parts of the country.

== See also ==
- Russians
- Russian diaspora
- Greece–Russia relations
- Demographics of Greece
- Greeks in Russia
