= John Simopoulos =

John Simopoulos (12 June 1923 – 4 March 2015) was a philosopher and fellow of St. Catherine's College, Oxford.

Simopoulos was born in Vienna, the son of Greek diplomat Charalambos Simopoulos, who was serving there. His father was also at one time ambassador to the Court of St James's in London.
