= Petros Vrailas Armenis =

Greek diplomat and philosopher (1812–1884)

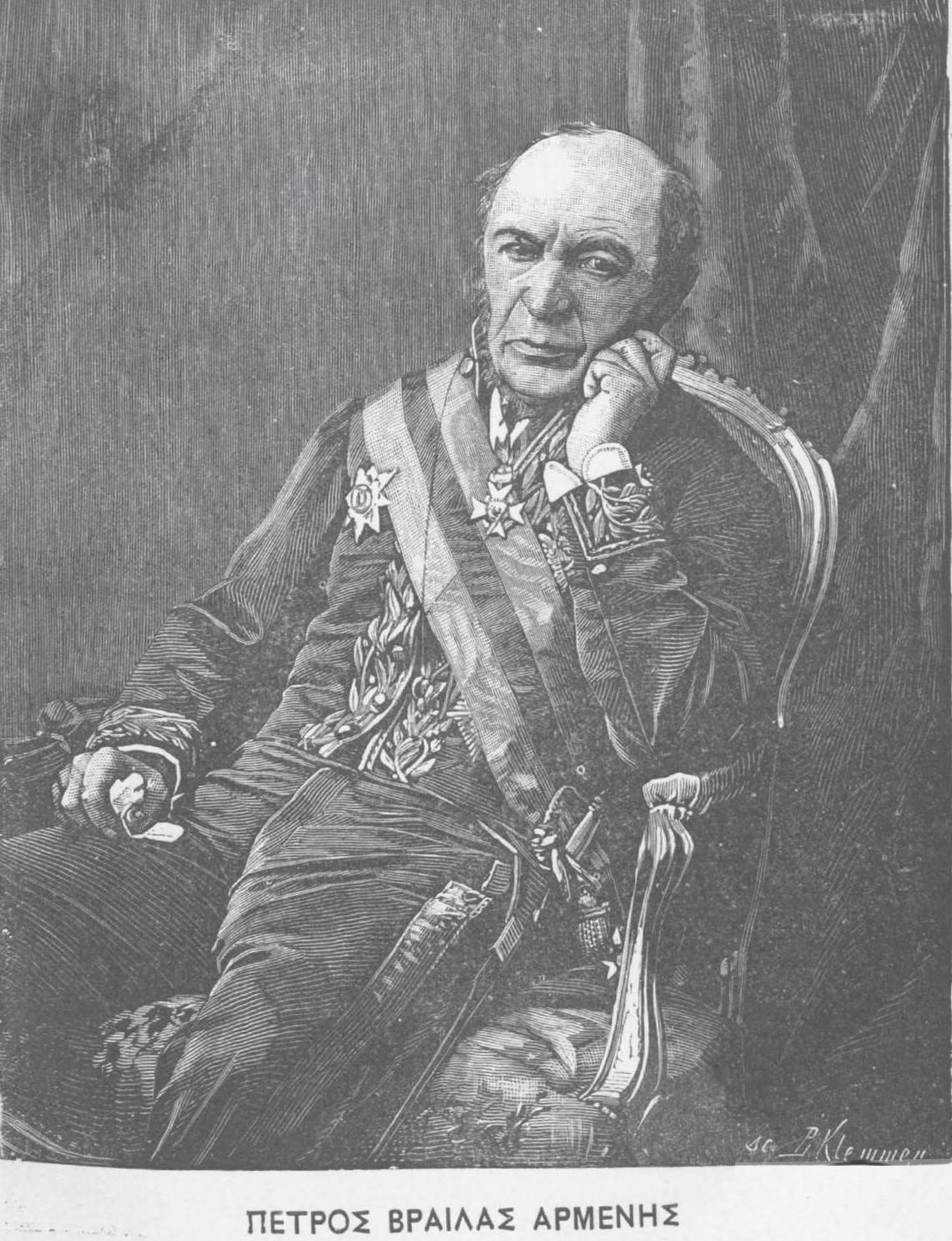
- Born: 1812; Corfu, Ionian Islands, Greece
- Died: 1884 (aged 71–72); London, UK
- Occupations: Philosopher, Politician, Diplomat
- Writing career
- Period: 19th century

Signature
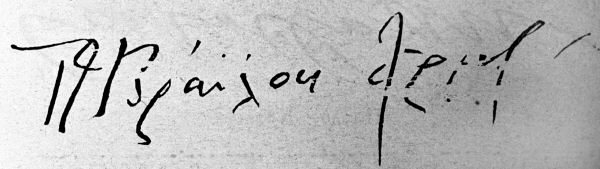

Petros Vrailas Armenis (Note: Surname components alternatively romanized as Vraïlas, Brailas, and Armenēs. Also hyphenated as e.g. Vrailas-Armenis.) (Greek: Πέτρος Βράιλας Αρμένης; 1812-1884) was a Greek philosopher, liberal politician, and diplomat from Corfu (Kerkyra) in the Ionian Islands. He was politically active during the era of British rule, being elected president of the protectorate's Legislative Assembly. After the islands were ceded to the Kingdom of Greece in 1864, he became an MP for Corfu in the Hellenic Parliament and served as a Greek diplomat, including as Minister of Foreign Affairs.

== Family ==
Petros Vrailas Armenis was the son of Demetrios Vrailas, a merchant from Vonitsa in Acarnania (then part of the Ottoman Empire), and Anna Angiola Armeni from Corfu. The Armenis family has roots in the Byzantine Empire and was present in the Ionian Islands during the Venetian era.

== Role in Corfiote culture ==
Vrailas Armenis completed his general education in Corfu before undertaking higher education in Western European cities, including Paris. He trained as a lawyer while studying philosophy. After returning to Corfu, he was involved in 1836 in founding the Corfu Reading Society, of which he became the first chairman. The society made European periodicals available for readers. He was also involved in founding the newspaper Patris in 1849. Historian Sakis Gekas describes him as "an emblematic figure of the Corfu liberal bourgeoisie."

He was a professor of philosophy at the Ionian Academy, the first Greek academic institution to be established in the modern era. His philosophical and cultural works include Περί πρώτων ιδεών και αρχών δοκίμιον (An Essay of First Ideas and Principles, 1851) and Περί της Ιστορικής Αποστολής της Ελλάδος (The Historical Mission of Greece). Constantine Cavarnos, a writer on religious and philosophical subjects, calls him "foremost Greek philosopher of the nineteenth century."

== Political career during British rule ==
During the British protectorate, Vrailas Armenis supported union (enosis) with Greece, but opposed the radicalism of the Party of Radicals. He approved of British-style constitutional monarchy; his political faction pushed for the Ionian Islands to similarly be governed constitutionally.

In 1864, the United Kingdom awarded him the Knight's Grand Cross of the Order of St. Michael and St. George (GCMG), making him "Sir Petros" to the British.

== Greek diplomatic career ==
In 1865, Vrailas Armenis became Greece's Minister of Foreign Affairs. He also served as Greece's ambassador to the United Kingdom, Russia, and France. He and Theodoros Deligiannis represented Greece at the Congress of Berlin.

== Legacy ==
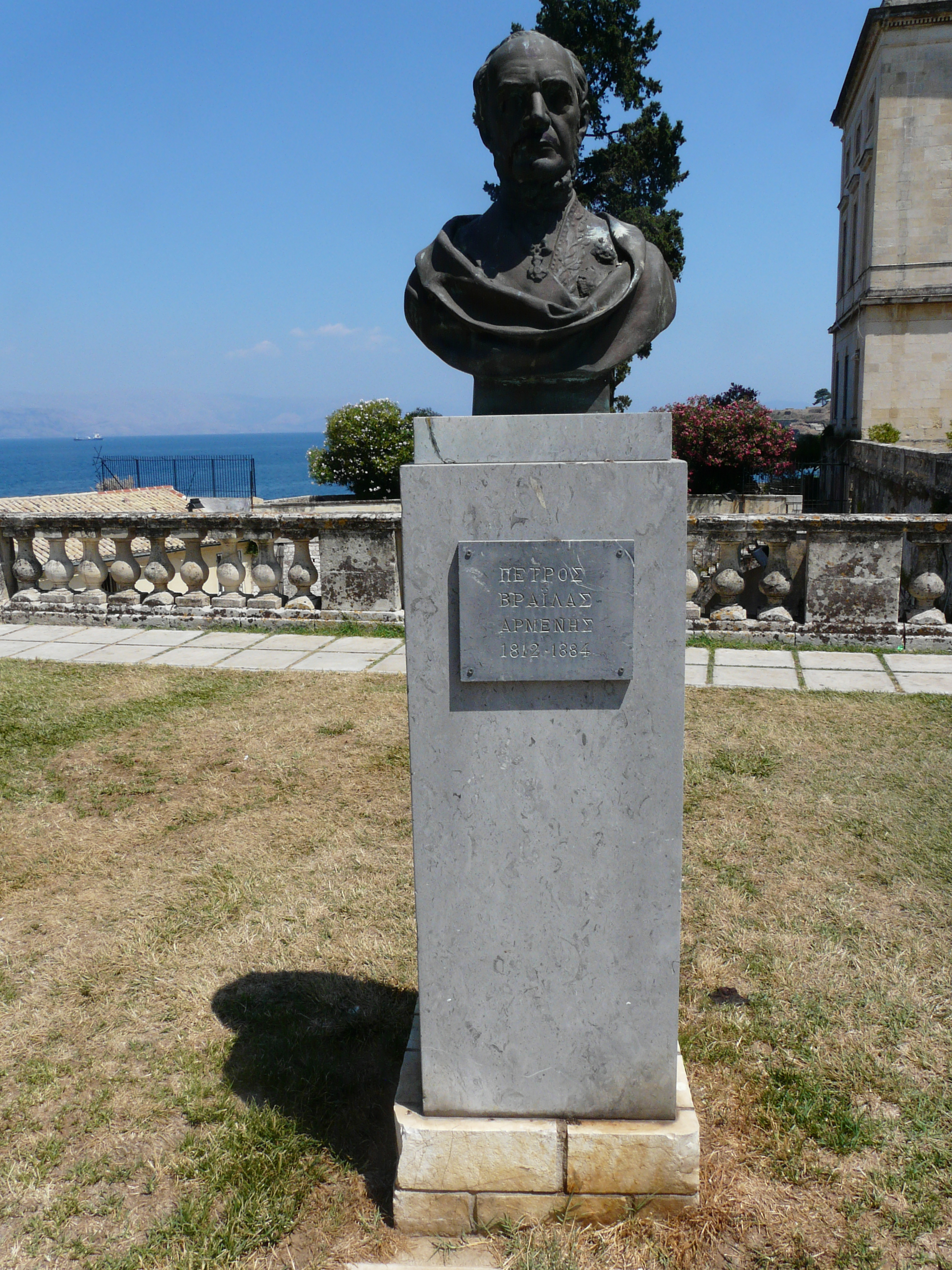
Bust of Vrailas Armenis at the Museum of Asian Art of Corfu.

Vrailas Armenis died in London in 1884.

His estate in Corfu was known as the Villa Vraila. The Achilleion Palace was later built in the same location by the new owner, Empress Elisabeth of Austria.

== See also ==
- List of ambassadors of Greece to Russia
- Andreas Kalvos
- Alexandros Rizos Rangavis

== Sources ==
- Cavarnos, Constantine, 1987. Modern Greek Philosophers on the Human Soul: Selections from the Writings of Seven Representative Thinkers of Modern Greece.
- Gekas, Sakis, 2016. Xenocracy: State, Class, and Colonialism in the Ionian Islands, 1815-1864.
- Glycofrydi-Leontsini, Athanasia, 2017. Petros Vrailas-Armenis: History and Philosophy in National Context. Hansmichael Hohenegger and Riccardo Pozzo. Relations de la philosophie avec son histoire. https://iris.univr.it/retrieve/handle/11562/972559/89168/Finale_LIE_ENTRETIENS.pdf
- "History and Mission". Anagnostiki-Etairia-Kerkyras. Reading Society of Corfu.
- Kitromilides, Paschalis M., 1994 John Locke and the Greek Intellectual Tradition: An Episode in Locke's Reception in South-East Europe. G.A.J. Rogers. Locke's Philosophy: Content and Context. https://core.ac.uk/download/pdf/61183538.pdf
- Merry, Bruce, 2004. Encyclopedia of Modern Greek Literature.
- Sakalis, Alex (2019). "A Forgotten Armenian History on a Small Greek Island". HyeTert.
- Sykka, Iota (2019). "A glimpse into the private life of Princess Sisi". eKathimerini. Kathimerini.
