= Tasia Athanasiou =

Greek diplomat

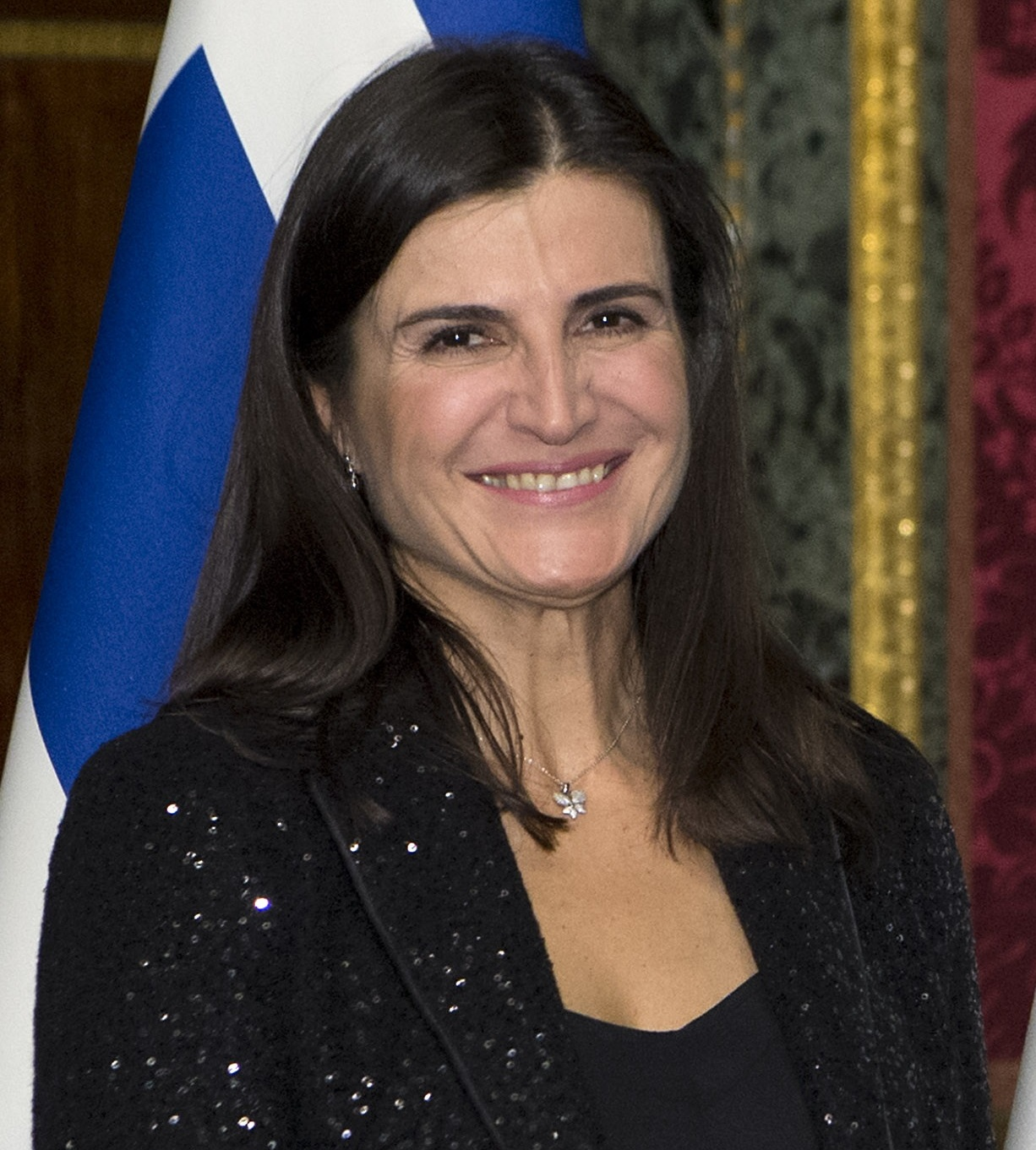
Athanasiou in 2017

Tasia Athanasiou (Greek: Τασία Αθανασίου) is the Greek Special Envoy for Syria (appointed 5 May 2020). When she was Greece’s Ambassador to Damascus from 2009 to 2012, Athanasiou was responsible for closing down the mission due to security concerns. It has been said that “her appointment is part of Greece’s effort to play a more active role in the Eastern Mediterranean ... (and is) a reflection of Greece’s interest in contributing to efforts to resolve the Syrian crisis.”

Athanasiou was Ambassador to Russia from April to August 2019 when she was replaced by Αikaterini Nasika after a change of government in Greece. She was also the Greek Ambassador to Poland from 2012 until 2017 and their ambassador to Italy.
