= Statue of Eleftherios Venizelos =

Statue in Washington, D.C., U.S.

- The statue in 2018
- Year: 2009
- Type: Sculpture
- Subject: Eleftherios Venizelos
- Location: Washington, D.C., United States; 38°54′43.52″N 77°03′00.06″W

An outdoor statue of Eleftherios Venizelos, a Greek Prime Minister, is installed outside the Embassy of Greece, on Massachusetts Avenue between Sheridan Circle and 22nd Street, NW, in Embassy Row, Washington, D.C., United States. It was erected by the Hellenic Parliament in 2009.

Near the statue is a plaque with the inscription: Eleftherios Venizelos / 1864–1936 / Liberal Politician, Statesman, Social Reformer / One of the most prominent Greek and European Leaders of the 20th Century. / He marked the modernization of Greece with his political initiatives.

== See also ==
- 2009 in art
