= Greece–Russia relations =

- Greece: Russia

Diplomatic mission
- Embassy of Greece, Moscow: Embassy of Russia, Athens

Greece–Russia relations are the bilateral foreign relations between Greece and Russia. The two countries first entered into diplomatic relations in 1828. Both Greece and Russia are members of international organizations and agreements, including the United Nations, Organization for Security and Cooperation in Europe, and the Organization of the Black Sea Economic Cooperation.

Relations between the governments of the two states deteriorated since the Annexation of Crimea by the Russian Federation in 2014, when Greece condemned Russian intervention and refused to recognize Crimea as part of Russia. In the summer of 2018 relations deteriorated even further. Since the 2022 Russian invasion of Ukraine political relations hit a historic low since Greek independence and severely damaged Russia's image in Greece.

Greece has an Embassy in Moscow, and three Consulates General: in Moscow, in Saint Petersburg and in Novorossiysk. Russia has an embassy in Athens, and a Consulate General in Thessaloniki.

== History ==
=== Background ===
Pontic Greeks historically inhabited the northern coast of the Black Sea and Crimea, Kursiver Textthe latter of which was incorporated into the Russian Empire in the latter half of the 18th century.

During the early years of the Kievan Rus', Vladimir the Great of what is now Russia and Ukraine sent out various missionaries to study different faiths that would suit the country, and most crucially, for him. One of his missionaries travelled to the Byzantine Empire and experienced enlightenment for themselves as they had come across Eastern Orthodoxy being practised in now modern-day Greece. The missionary described it as being Heaven on Land. This began the very first ties and cultural similarities between Russia and Greece.

William Martin Leake, who traveled through the Ottoman Empire roughly between 1800 and 1810, wrote in his work Travels in Northern Greece that the Greeks in the Delvino region at that time held a very negative view of the Russians due to their conduct in the Orlov Revolt and their administration of the Septinsular Republic.

Russia assisted the Greeks against the Ottoman rule prior to and during the Greek War of Independence that broke out in 1821. Ioannis Kapodistrias, the first Governor of the First Hellenic Republic, had previously served as Russia's foreign minister. The Russian Empire established diplomatic ties with the Greek State on 6 [N.S. 18] September 1828.

The second queen of modern Greece was born Grand Duchess Olga Constantinovna of Russia, granddaughter of Tsar Nicholas I.

The Kingdom of Greece and the Russian Empire fought for the Allied Powers during the First World War against the Central Powers, and the two fought alongside each other during the Second World War for the Allies against the Axis powers.

In the autumn of 1920, Soviet Russia, having concluded a friendship treaty with the Government of the Grand National Assembly in March 1921, began to extend material assistance, in both gold and arms, to Mustafa Kemal's regime in Ankara, thus significantly contributing to his military success during the war against the Greeks in Asia Minor, where the Greek genocide was completed as a result in 1922.

The USSR and the Kingdom of Greece established diplomatic relations on 8 March 1924. Official relations were frosty in the 1930s, especially under the staunchly-anticommunist authoritarian regime of Greek Prime Minister Ioannis Metaxas. The Percentages Agreement struck by Joseph Stalin and Winston Churchill in Moscow in October 1944, which placed Greece firmly in the British sphere of influence, led to the Soviet Union's noninterference in support of the communist uprising in Athens in December 1944, which was crushed with British help as and Stalin's refusal to render tangible assistance to the Greek Communists during the Greek Civil War, which they lost in October 1949.

Most ethnic Greeks living in Crimea as well as other regions near the Black Sea in the Soviet Union were deported to the east of the country in three waves of forced resettlement in the 1940s. A significant number of Soviet Greeks, especially those living in the Kazakh Soviet Socialist Republic and other Central Asian Soviet republics, emigrated to Greece in the late 1980s and the early 1990s, shortly prior to the end of the Soviet Union.

According to Western intelligence officials, Greece's society and political establishment have been deeply penetrated by the Soviet and later the Russian espionage agencies.

=== Diplomatic spat of 2018 ===
In early July 2018, the government of Greece expelled two Russian diplomats and barred the entry of two others accusing them of undermining Greece's national security. The move was made public, which was seen by experts as unprecedented in mutual relations. Amid the subsequent acrimonious exchange of official statements, Greece accused the Russian Foreign Ministry of "disrespect for a third country and a lack of understanding of today's world, in which states, regardless of their size, are independent and can exercise an independent, multidimensional and democratic foreign policy". Following Russia's retaliatory move in early August, it was revealed Greece intended to recall its ambassador, Andreas Fryganas, who had been appointed in May 2016.

The Greek Foreign Ministry′s statement on 10 August 2018 stated: ″Since [Russia] began fighting as a comrade in arms with Turkey, providing it with a number of facilitations in the security sector, it appears to be steadily distancing itself from positions befitting the level of friendship and cooperation that has characterized Greek-Russian relations for the past 190 years. It appears not to understand that Greece has its own interests and criteria in international politics". The statement accused Russia of ″attempts to a) bribe state officials, b) undermine its foreign policy, and c) interfere in its internal affairs″.

On 7 December 2018, Greek Prime Minister Alexis Tsipras went to Russia on a working visit, his first visit there in three years. After talks with Vladimir Putin, both leaders expressed hope that the spat between the two countries was in the past, bilateral agreements were signed and international issues like the Cyprus dispute were discussed. Tsipras said that he had expressed to Putin his concern at Turkey buying advanced weapons, such as S-400 missile systems, from Russia. Experts noted that Greek-Russian relations were not as they had been prior to the spat because of the growing importance of Greece's strategic military ties with the US, and military co-operation between Russia and Turkey was increasing. On 13 December 2018, in Washington, D.C., the Greek Foreign Minister and the American Secretary of State formally launched what they called "the inaugural U.S.-Greece Strategic Dialogue", which Greek Acting Foreign Minister Georgios Katrougalos characterised as ″a procedure that shows the upgrading of our relations with that country″ and ″the apex of our bilateral relations″.

=== Prespa agreement ===
Russia has been accused by certain Greek politicians and parties of having sought to thwart the Prespa agreement, reached in June 2018 between Greece and North Macedonia, which was meant to resolve the dispute over the latter's name and was seen as removing the main obstacle for North Macedonia's accession to NATO.

On 14 January 2019, the Russian Foreign Ministry issued a commentary that referred to the agreement as the "Prespa deal" and stated that the decision by the Parliament of North Macedonia to change the country's name had been imposed from outside and did not reflect the will of the people and came "with an aim of pulling Skopje into NATO as soon as possible". The statement went on to cite "the recent developments in Greece — withdrawal from the government coalition of the Independent Greeks Party leader, Panos Kammenos, coming out against the Prespa accord" as evidence that stability and security in the Balkans was thus being undermined. The ministry suggested that "the issue must be considered by the UN Security Council in accordance with Article 3 of UN Security Council Resolution 845". The Russian Foreign Ministry's statement on the Prespa agreement was condemned by Greece, whose official statement concluded by saying, "We express our certitude that Russia, which has for years recognized F.Y.R.O.M as the 'Republic of Macedonia' will respect the sensibilities of the Greek people in using the name Macedonia and will henceforth refer to this country with its new constitutional name, i.e. 'North Macedonia', and most importantly that it will refrain from such statements, which constitute an intervention in Greece's interior affairs".

=== 2022 diplomatic crisis and reactions ===
After the 2022 Russian invasion of Ukraine started, Greece, as one of the EU countries, imposed sanctions on Russia, and Russia added all EU countries to the list of "unfriendly nations".

A diplomatic crisis sparked between Greece and Russia, when the latter's air forces allegedly bombarded two Greek minority villages near Mariupol in Ukraine, during the Russian invasion of Ukraine, killing 12 ethnic Greeks. Greece protested strongly, summoning the Russian ambassador. France's President Emmanuel Macron, and US Secretary of State Antony Blinken, along with Germany, Poland, Sweden and other countries, expressed their condolences to Greece for the massacre, while Moscow denied any involvement, with the Russian embassy claiming a Ukrainian far-right militant organization, the Azov Battalion, was behind the incident. Athens refuted Moscow's claims, announcing evidence of Russian involvement. Following this, Greece's Prime Minister Kyriakos Mitsotakis announced Greece will send defensive military equipment and humanitarian aid to support Ukraine.

Almost all parties in the Greek parliament have denounced the invasion.

Mitsotakis' decision to send military equipment to Ukraine has been challenged; only New Democracy and KINAL were in favor. On the other hand, the majority of Greek people did not approve of sending the weapons; according to a recent poll, 63% of Greeks believe that the action puts relations with Russia at risk, while only 33% agree on providing Ukraine with military equipment. In March 2022 60% of Greeks considered Russia's invasion unacceptable, and in May 2022 the majority supported sanctions against Russia.

The diplomatic crisis between the two countries continues as the invasion is in progress. On March 6, Russian Foreign Ministry spokeswoman Maria Zakharova accused Greece of anti-Russian propaganda, which goes against the countries' historical ties. The Greek Ministry of Foreign Affairs described Zakharova's statements as "unacceptable", insinuating that Greece has not opposed Russia in any way as of then. Greece joined other countries in spring 2022 in declaring a number of Russian diplomats persona non grata.

Through 2022 and 2023 military equipment was provided to Ukraine, with the Greek Government confirming support for Ukraine and a need to punish Russia for war crimes. In August 2023 Greece offered to train Ukrainian pilots on F-16 fighters.

== Military cooperation ==
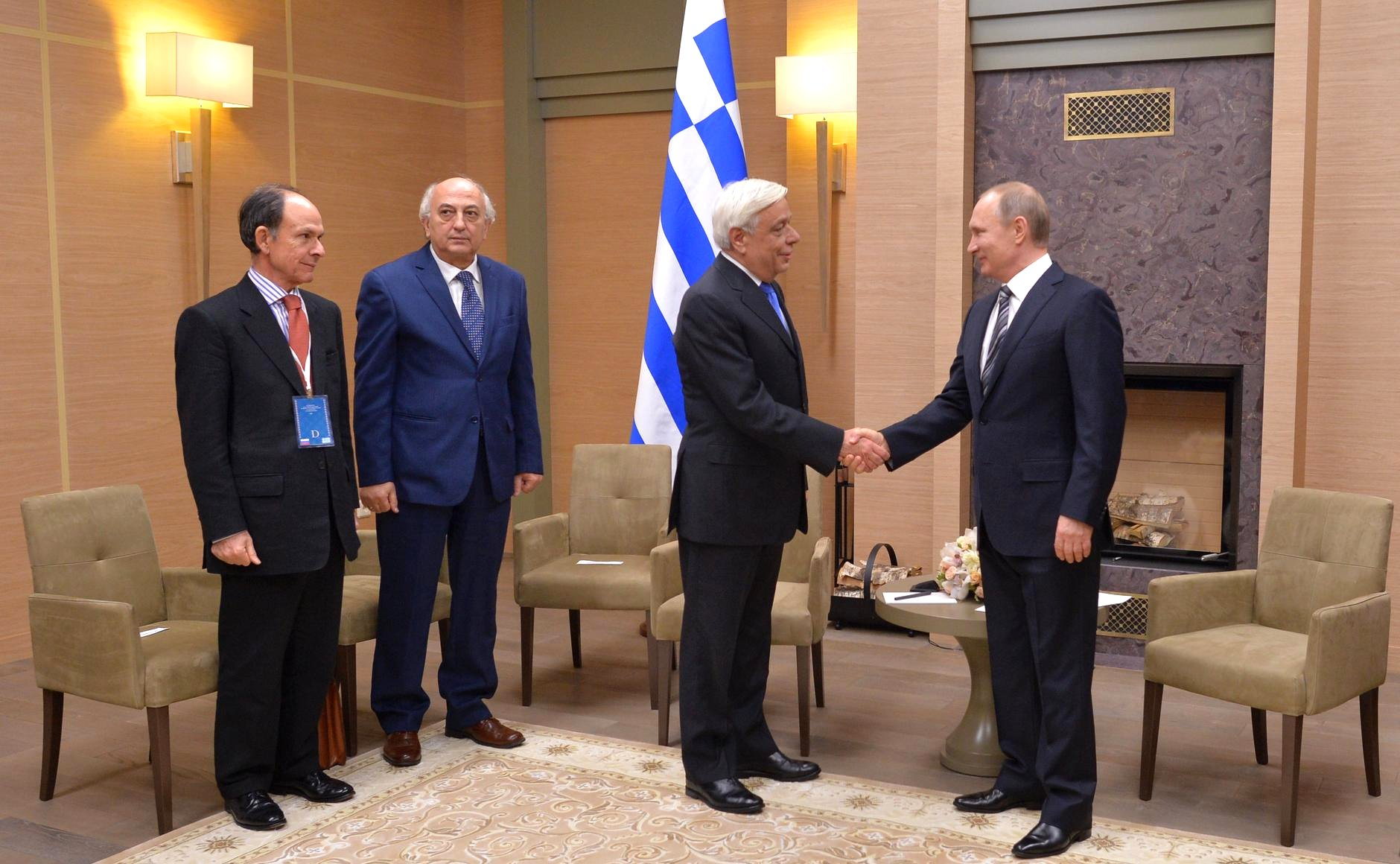
Russian President Vladimir Putin with Greek President Prokopis Pavlopoulos in 2016

Greece is one of the few pre-1990 NATO member countries (alongside Germany for a time) that makes extensive use of Russian weapons. Greece first received many Soviet-era surplus weapons, such as BMP-1 armoured fighting vehicles, RM-70 rocket launchers, ZU-23-2 anti-aircraft guns and SA-8 anti-aircraft missile systems from the former East German National People's Army inventory in the early 1990s. Since then, Greece has additionally procured the TOR M-1 and S-300 anti-aircraft missile systems (the latter originally destined for Cyprus), the Kornet-E anti-tank missile, AK-74M assault rifles and ZUBR hovercraft. The militaries of both countries also participate in programmes of military cooperation in the Aegean Sea and the Eastern Mediterranean Sea, as well as giving military support and training to countries that they have close relations with, such as Armenia, with Greece often accepting Armenian military officials in the Hellenic Military Academy.

== Economic relations ==
=== Burgas-Alexandroupoli pipeline ===
The Burgas-Alexandroupoli pipeline was proposed in 1993–1994 by several Russian and Greek companies. In 1994, for construction of the pipeline Greece and Bulgaria signed a bilateral agreement, followed by a memorandum of cooperation, signed by Greece and Russia.

In February 1998, a Greek consortium for pipeline construction named Bapline was established, and in May 1998, a memorandum of creation of the Transbalkan Oil Pipeline Company was signed. In 2000, a technical specifications and an economic evaluation of the project were prepared by the German company ILF. A joint protocol for preparing the pipeline's construction was signed by the three countries in January 2005.

The political memorandum between both governments was signed on 12 April 2005. An inter-governmental agreement on the project was agreed on 7 February 2007, and it was signed on 15 March 2007 in Athens, by the involved ministers of the three countries, under the presence of their leaders, Vladimir Putin (Russian president), Sergei Stanishev (Bulgarian prime-minister), and Kostas Karamanlis (prime-minister of Greece).

The agreement establishing the international project company was signed in Moscow on 18 December 2007 and the company, called Trans-Balkan Pipeline B.V., was incorporated in the Netherlands on 6 February 2008. Construction of the pipeline was scheduled to start in October 2009, and was estimated to be completed by 2011. In 2011, the project was definitively terminated.

=== Trade ===
Between 1995 and 2021 Russian exports to Greece have risen by an average of 9.27% per annum.

There is a large imbalance in trade, in 2021 Greece imported $6.3 billion of goods, mainly energy related oil and gas, whilst exports to Russia were just $468m. In 2022 and 2023 the EU introduced sanctions over Russian oil and oil products as well as gas imports, which Greece has complied with and will greatly reduce the trade imbalance with Russia.

Following the 2022 Russian invasion of Ukraine Greek shipping continued its major role in transporting Russian oil and oil products, in accordance with international sanction regulations, however Greek shipping companies also profited by selling a large number of older tankers at high prices to companies intending to operate the tankers to facilitate sanction breaking, so called "grey tankers".

== Religious and cultural ties, mutual perceptions ==
Religious ties between the two nations with majorities of both countries adhering to the Eastern Orthodox Church, have played a major role in fostering bilateral relations. Since its formation in 1994, the Athens-based Interparliamentary Assembly on Orthodoxy has become a relevant institution in promoting exchange and cooperation.

Those relations have faltered since the 2018 Moscow–Constantinople schism and the Russian invasion of Ukraine, with the Russian Orthodox Church supporting the invasion and the Greek church being one of the most vocal against Russian aggression.

== Agreements ==
The following agreements are in place:

- Friendship and Cooperation Agreement (1993)
- Agreement on Economic, Industrial, Technological, and Scientific Cooperation (1993)

== Resident diplomatic missions ==
- Greece has an embassy in Moscow and a consulate-general in Saint Petersburg.
- Russia has an embassy in Athens and a consulate-general in Thessaloniki.
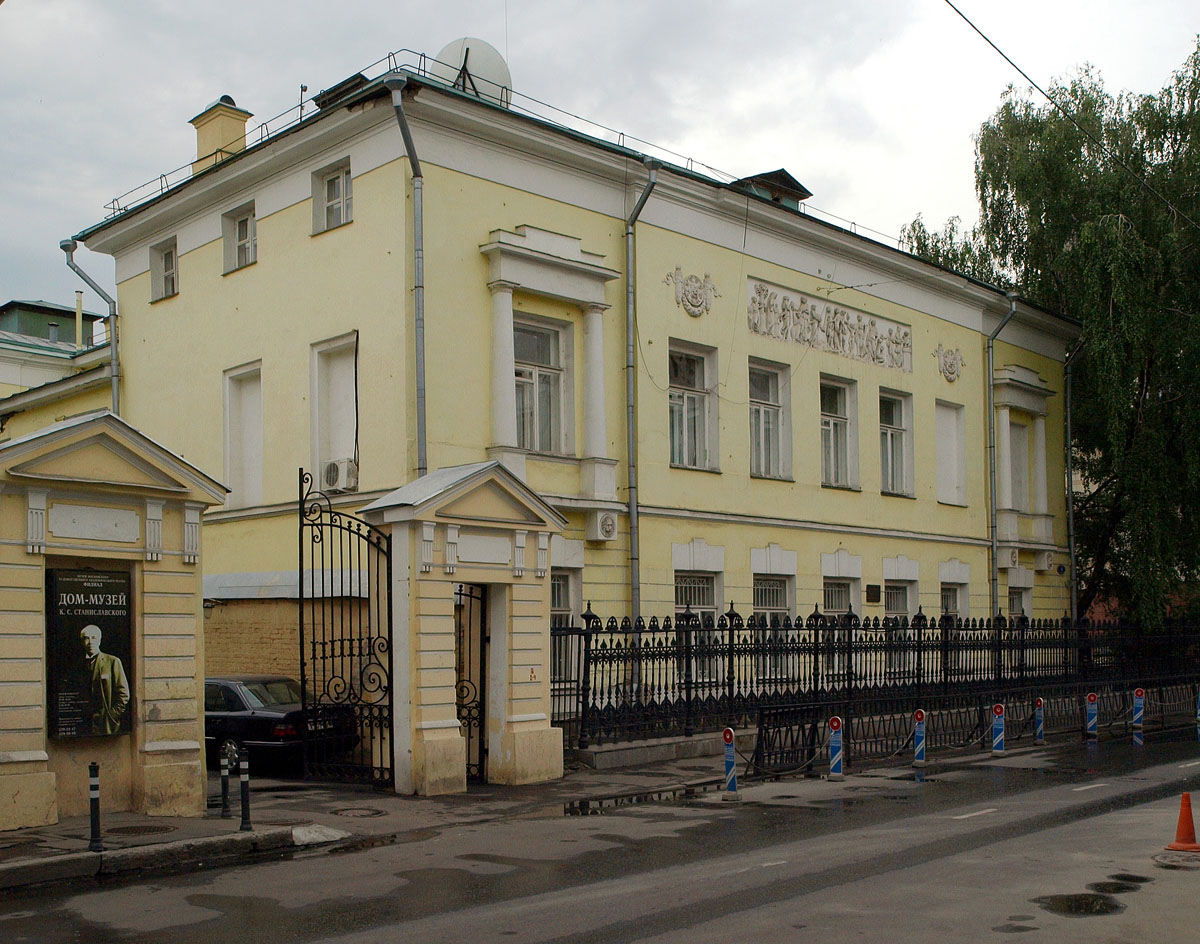
Embassy of Greece in Moscow

== See also ==
- Foreign relations of Greece
- Foreign relations of Russia
- Greeks in Russia
- Russians in Greece
- List of ambassadors of Russia to Greece
- List of ambassadors of Greece to Russia
