= Union of Royalists =

Union of Royalists Ένωσις Βασιλοφρόνων
- Founder: Ioannis Metaxas
- Founded: 1935
- Dissolved: 1936
- Ideology: Monarchism; Nationalism
- Political position: Far-right

The Union of Royalists (Greek: Ένωσις Βασιλοφρόνων) was a coalition of far-right Greek political parties for the elections of 1935.

Its main leader was Ioannis Metaxas. Members to the coalition were:

- Freethinkers' Party
- Ioannis Rallis
- Georgios Stratos
- several independent royalists and former members of the People's Party
