= Giannis Koromilas =

Greek footballer (born 2002)

Personal information
- Full name: Ioannis Koromilas
- Date of birth: 20 June 2002 (age 24)
- Place of birth: Greece
- Height: 1.75 m (5 ft 9 in)
- Position: Midfielder

Team information
- Current team: Anagennisi Arta

Youth career
- 2011–2021: AEK Athens

Senior career*
Years	Team	Apps	(Gls)
2021–2024	AEK Athens B	26	(2)
2024–	Anagennisi Arta		
- * Club domestic league appearances and goals as of 30 November 2023

Giannis Koromilas (Greek: Γιάννης Κορομηλάς; born 20 June 2002) is a Greek professional footballer who plays as a midfielder for Gamma Ethniki club Anagennisi Arta.
