= Alexandra Papadopoulou (diplomat) =

Greek diplomat

- Αλεξάνδρα Παπαδοπούλου
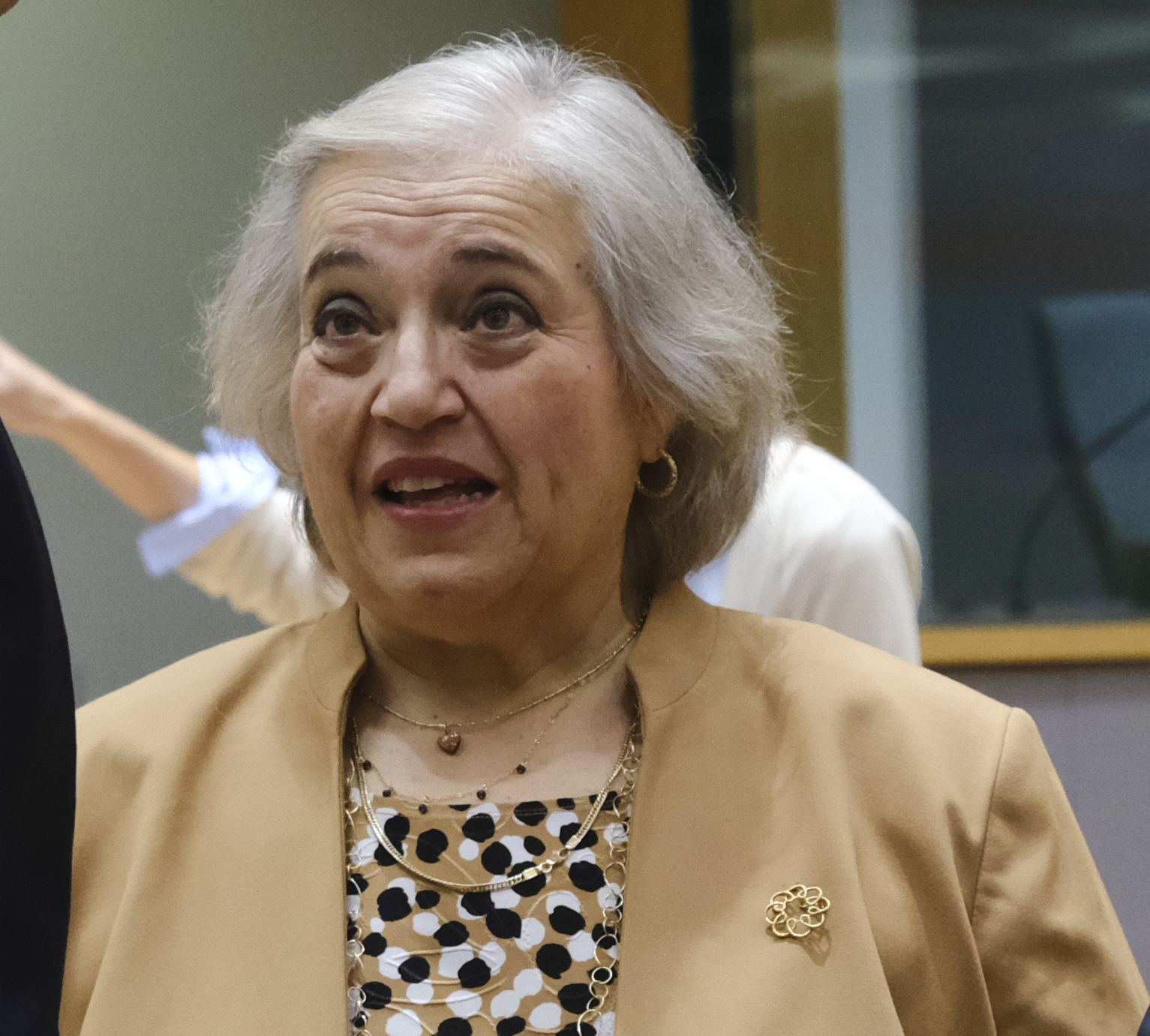
- Alexandra Papadopoulou in 2024.

Deputy Minister of Foreign Affairs
- Incumbent
- Assumed office 26 June 2023
- Prime Minister: Kyriakos Mitsotakis
- Minister: Giorgos Gerapetritis

Greek Ambassador to the United States
- In office 1 February 2020 – 27 April 2023
- President: Prokopis Pavlopoulos; Katerina Sakellaropoulou
- Minister: Nikos Dendias

Personal details
- Born: 10 April 1957 (age 69) Athens, Greece
- Education: University of Athens (BA); University of Pennsylvania (MA)

Alexandra Papadopoulou (born 10 April 1957) is a former Greek Ambassador to the United States and held in the position from February 2020 to June 2023. She is the first woman to serve in that post. Since June 2023, she serves as Deputy Minister of Foreign Affairs in the Greek Government under Kyriakos Mitsotakis.

== Early life and education ==
Papadopoulou earned a law degree from the University of Athens in Greece, where she also studied political science. As a Fulbright Scholar, she earned a Master's Degree in International Relations/International Law from the University of Pennsylvania.

== Career ==
Before becoming Ambassador to the USA, she served as the Head of the Diplomatic Cabinet of the Prime Minister as well as Head of the European Union Rule of Law Mission (EULEX) in Kosovo. She has also been the Greek Ambassador to Paraguay and Uruguay (12/2015 – 8/2016) and Permanent Representative to the European Union.
