= GlavUpDK =

Russian state unitary enterprise

The Main Administration for Service to the Diplomatic Corps (GlavUpDK) is a Russian state unitary enterprise, subordinate to the Ministry of Foreign Affairs of the Russian Federation. Its main purpose is to fulfill Russia's international obligations regarding the accommodation and servicing of diplomatic missions, consular offices, and international organisations. The enterprise is included in the list of strategic enterprises of the Russian Federation.

The current head of GlavUpDK is Vyacheslav N. Fatin.

== History ==
The history of GlavUpDK began in 24 August 1921, when the Council of Labor and Defense, chaired by V. I. Lenin, adopted a resolution establishing, under the People's Commissariat for Foreign Affairs, the Central Bureau for Servicing Foreigners in Moscow (abbreviated as Burobin). At that time, about 20 foreign diplomatic missions were operating in Moscow and needed premises, furniture, and food amid the conditions of the Civil War. By 1 September 1921, Burobin had received 38 mansions, most of which are still used to accommodate embassies.

During World War 2, Burobin ensured the evacuation of the diplomatic corps to Kuybyshev (now Samara), while some employees remained in Moscow to guard embassy buildings.

On 14 July 1947, by a resolution of the Council of Ministers of the Soviet Union, Burobin was reorganised into the Directorate for Servicing the Diplomatic Corps (UpDK). In 1988, the enterprise received its modern name — the Main Administration for Service to the Diplomatic Corps (GlavUpDK). In 1998, it was transformed into a federal state unitary enterprise.

In 2005, subsidiary structures joined the enterprise: Spetsavtotsentr, Medintsentr, and the Inpredkadry firm. By Presidential Decree No. 1009 of 4 August 2004, GlavUpDK was included in the list of strategic enterprises (entry No. 60).

== Activities ==
The primary business activity of the organisation is all-round provision and service for diplomatic and other foreign representations in Moscow. However, by granting periods of work experience and encouraging higher professionalism of its employees, GlavUpDK is allowed to extend the scope of its business and offer a wide range of services to Russian and foreign public and commercial organisations.

GlavUpDK provides renting services of residential premises and offices, medical services, hosting of business and entertainment events, provides accounting, HR services and transportation services.

The services of GlavUpDK, often called the 'ministry of hospitality', are used by over 180 embassies and representatives of international organisations, over 100 correspondent offices of mass media and more than 2000 Russian and foreign companies
