= Basil Vitsaksis =

Greek lawyer and diplomat

Basil Vitsaksis was a Greek lawyer and diplomat. He graduated from law school after World War II and represented Greece in the Greek case before the European Commission of Human Rights on behalf of the Greek junta. For this, he was appointed as the Greek ambassador to the United States in 1969.
