= Charalambos Simopoulos =

Greek diplomat

Charalambos John Simopoulos
- Χαράλαμπος Σιμόπουλος
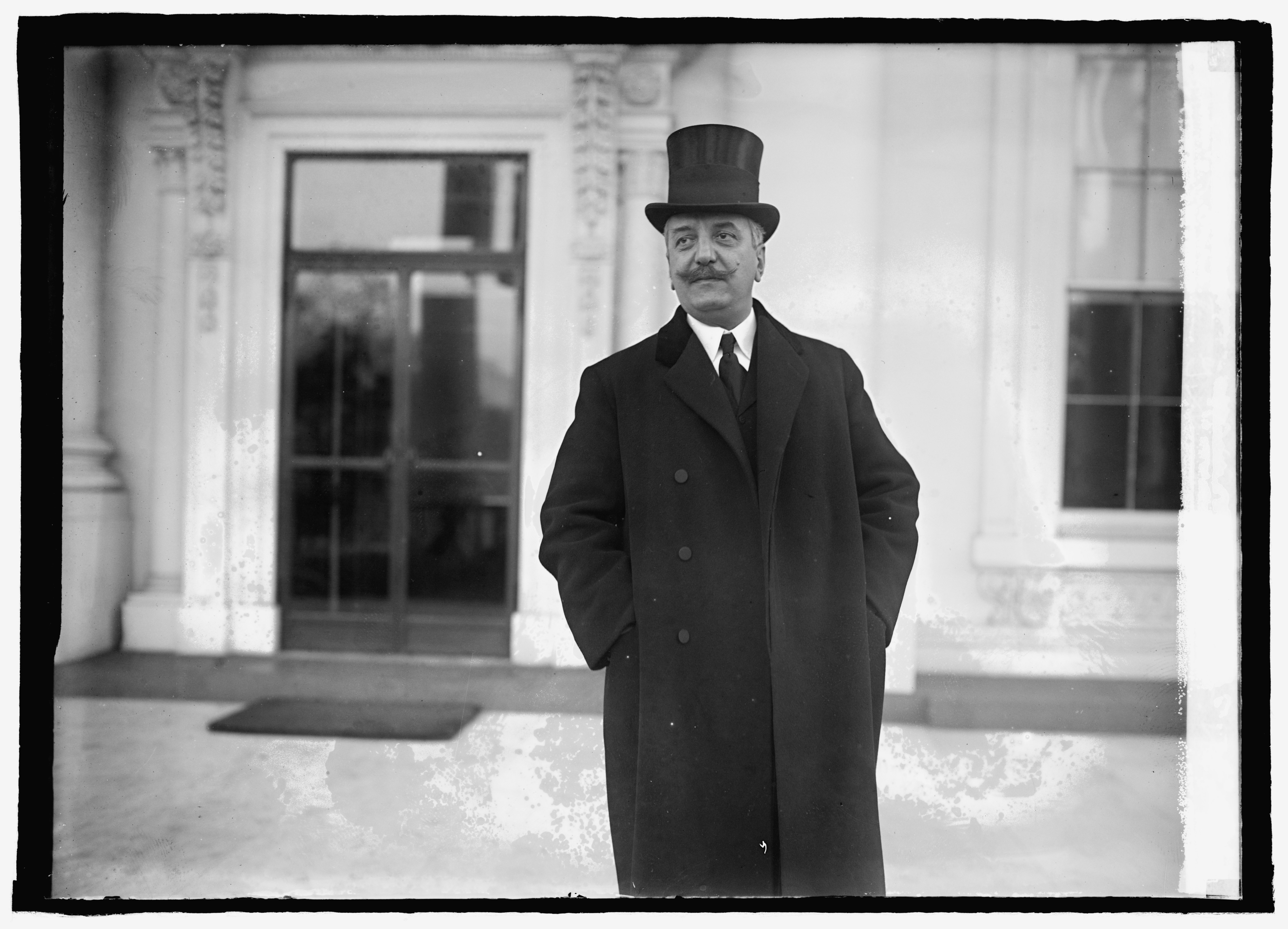
- Simopoulos at the White House in 1924

Greek Ambassador to the United States
- In office December 12, 1924 – April 26, 1935
- Preceded by: Konstantinos D. Xanthopoulos, Charge d'Affaires a.i.
- Succeeded by: Dimitrios Sisilianos

Greek Ambassador to the United Kingdom
- In office November 1, 1934 – 1942
- Preceded by: Dimitrios Kaklamanos
- Succeeded by: Athanasios Agnidis

Personal details
- Born: July 1, 1874
- Died: October 24, 1942 (aged 68) London
- Spouse: Mme. Simopoulos was British-born.
- Parent: Sophie Veropoulos (mother)
- Education: Doctor of Divinity in Laws University of Athens, further studies in France and Germany

Charalambos John Simopoulos (Greek: Χαράλαμπος Σιμόπουλος; 1874-1942) was a Greek diplomat who was ambassador to the Court of St. James in London at the beginning of the Second World War.

After studying law at the University of Athens, he entered the diplomatic corps in 1901, serving as secretary and dean of the consulates of Alexandria, Mersin, Constantinople. From 1914 to 1919 he was employed at the legations in Paris and Rome. From 1920 to 1921 he was the first ambassador of Greece to Czechoslovakia. In 1922 he was Greek High Commissioner of the Occupation of Constantinople.

On December 12, 1924 he became Minister to Washington, D.C. In 1934 he was appointed Minister to Great Britain, and in May 1942 the Greek legation was raised to the status of an embassy.

His son was the Oxford University academic John Simopoulos.

Simopoulos's funeral was held at St Sophia's Cathedral, Moscow Road, London.
