= Alexandros Matsas =

Greek poet

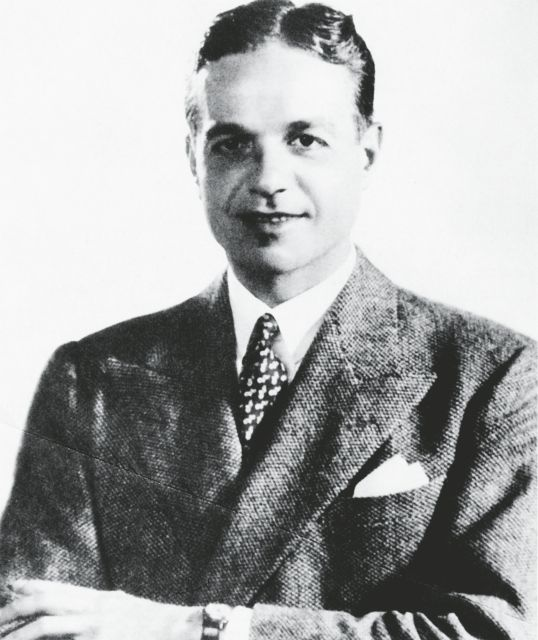
Alexandros Matsas

Alexandros A. Mátsas (Greek: Αλέξανδρος Μάτσας, 1911 – 1969) was a Greek poet and ambassador of Greece. He was born in Athens, Greece. After following courses on political science and classical studies at Oxford University, he entered the Greek diplomatic service in 1934. He served in various posts in Egypt, Paris, The Hague, and Rome, and was Royal Greek Ambassador to Turkey and the United States of America.

He published several books of poetry (the first written in French) and three poetical dramas on ancient themes, of which two (Clytemnestra and Croesus) were produced by the Royal Theater of Athens in 1957 and 1963 respectively.

== Works ==
- Poems. Athens. 1946.

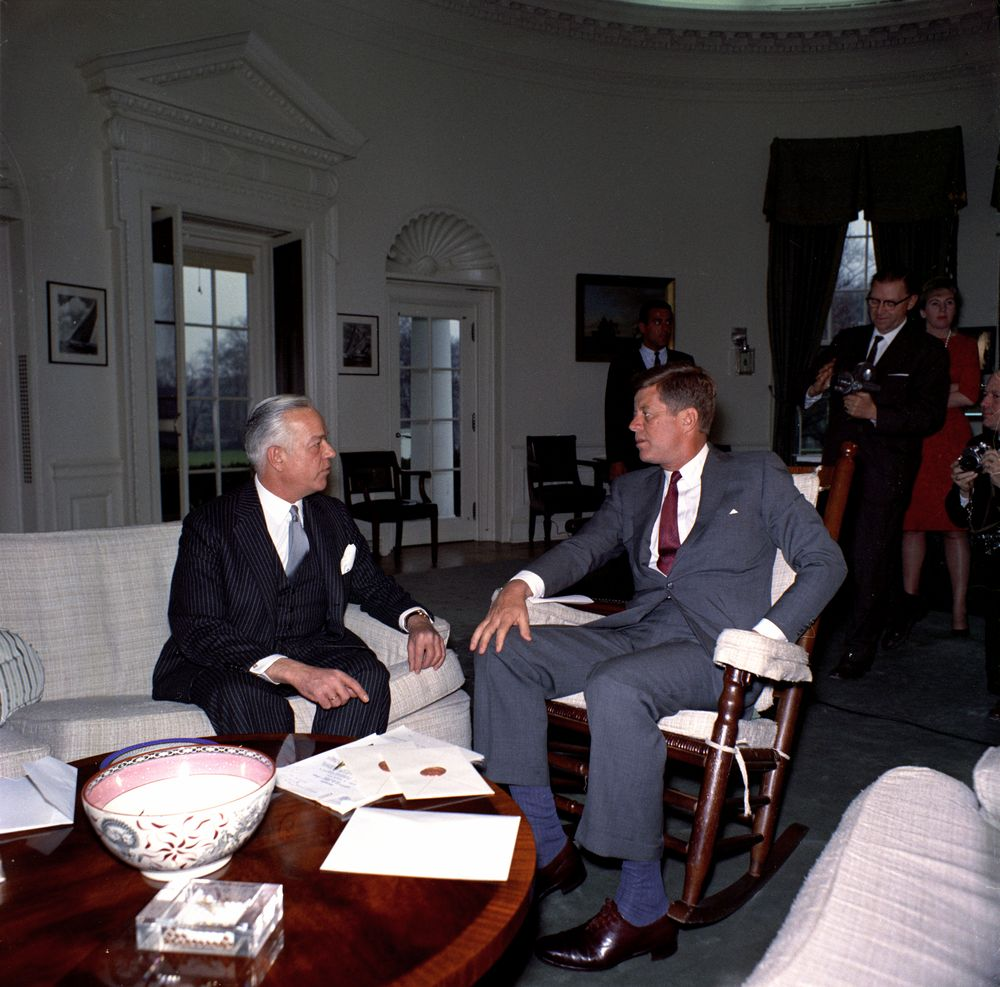
JFK meeting with the Ambassador of Greece, Alexander A. Matsas

== Sources ==
- Modern European Poetry. Bantam Books, 1966. Kimon Friar editor and translator of the Greek section.
- Columbia dictionary of modern European literature
