= 1935 Greek parliamentary election =

← 1933	9 June 1935	1936 →

All 300 seats in the Hellenic Parliament 151 seats needed for a majority
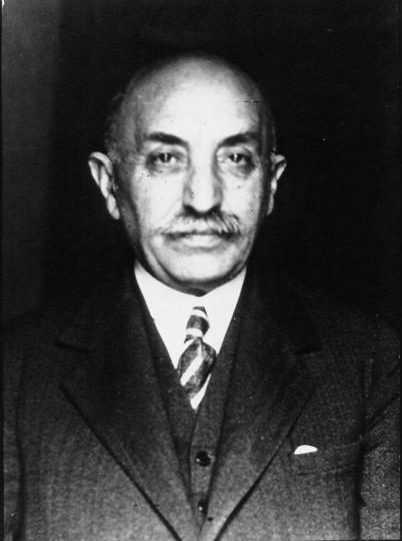

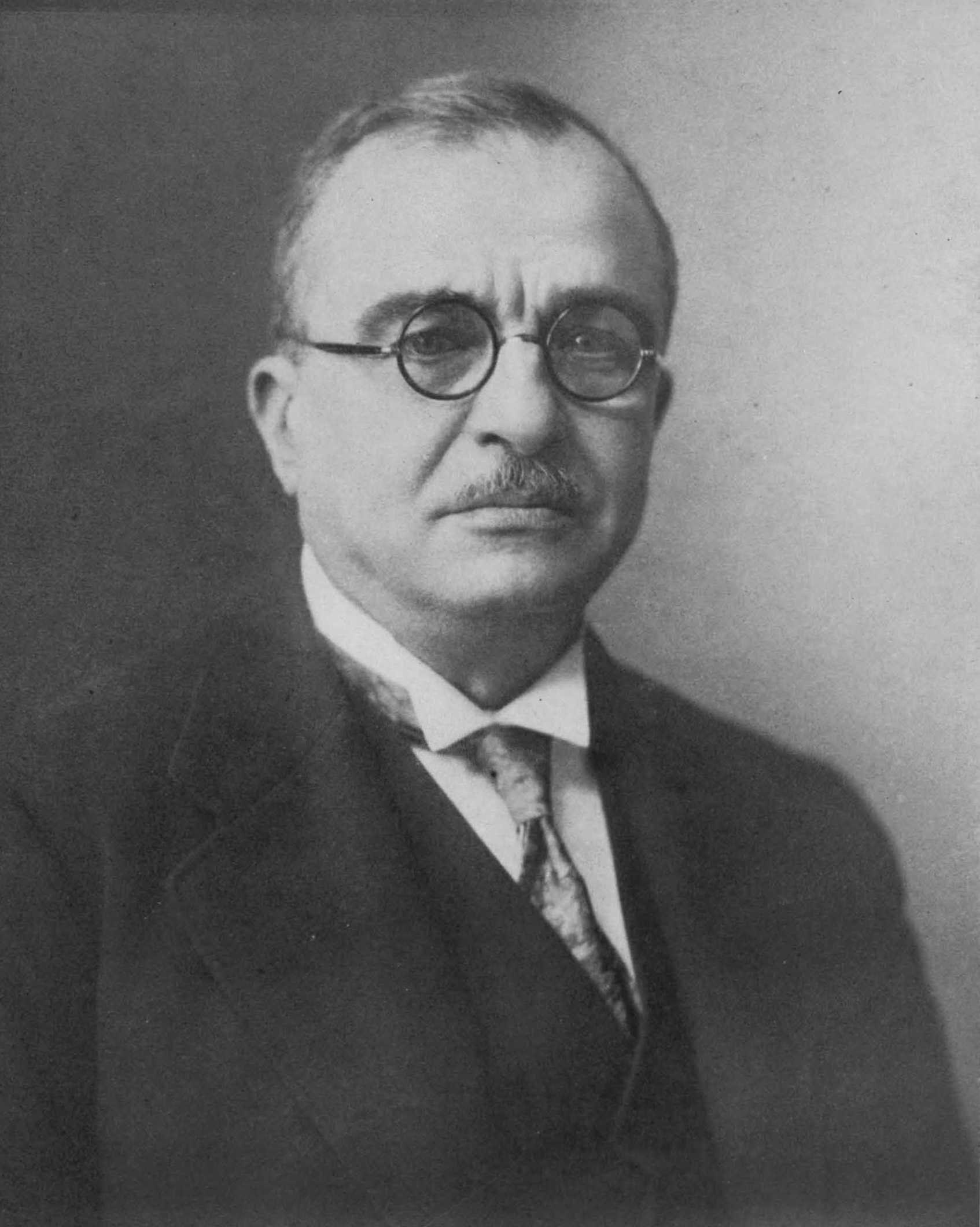
	First party	Second party
Leader	Panagis Tsaldaris	Ioannis Metaxas
Party	LK–ERK	EV
Last election	42.16%, 129 seats	2.26%, 6 seats
Seats won	287	7
Seat change	▲158	▲1
Popular vote	669,434	152,285
Percentage	65.04%	14.80%
Swing	▲22.88 pp	▲12.54 pp
Prime Minister before election
Panagis Tsaldaris
People's Party
Prime Minister after election
Panagis Tsaldaris
People's Party

Parliamentary elections were held in Greece on 9 June 1935. The result was a victory for the People's Party–National Radical Party alliance, which won 287 of the 300 seats in Parliament.

The elections were held in a climate of tension between the liberal Republicans, represented by the Venizelist parties, and the pro-royalist People's Party, following the failed Venizelist coup attempt in March. In protest at the execution of two prominent Venizelist generals, the continued function of special courts, and at the new electoral law, which they had not approved, all Venizelist parties decided not to participate. Without opponents, the right-wing parties had no problem in dominating the Parliament, whose role would be to adopt a new constitution and decide about the restoration of monarchy in the person of the exiled King George II.

== Results ==
Party	Votes	%	Seats	+/–
People's Party–National Radical Party	669,434	65.04	287	+158
Union of Royalists	152,285	14.80	7	+1
Communists and Allies	98,699	9.59	0	0
Macedonian Union	29,664	2.88	0	New
National Party	5,636	0.55	0	New
National Union of Greece	2,590	0.25	0	New
Independents	70,888	6.89	6	+6
Total	1,029,196	100.00	300	+52
Valid votes	1,029,196	94.39		
Invalid/blank votes	61,166	5.61		
Total votes	1,090,362	100.00		
Source: Nohlen & Stöver
