= To Asty =

- Type: Daily newspaper
- Format: Broadsheet
- Founded: 1885
- Ceased publication: 1907
- Political alignment: Progressive
- Headquarters: Athens, Greece

To Asty (Greek: Το Άστυ) was a Greek newspaper based in Athens.
