= Athanase George Politis =

Greek diplomat and historian

- Born: 24 March 1893
- Died: 4 April 1968 (aged 75); New York
- Occupations: Diplomat, historian

Athanase George Politis (Greek: Αθανάσιος Γ. Πολίτης; 24 March 1893 – 4 April 1968 in New York) was a Greek diplomat and historian, ambassador to the U.S.S.R. (1941–47) and to the United States (1950–54), who also represented his country at United Nations regional conferences. He had also "spent more than thirty years in his country's legations and embassies in Egypt, England, Japan." He resigned "in disagreement with the Cyprus policy of the Greek Government."

== Writings ==
- L'Hellénisme et l'Égypte moderne, Félix Alcan, Paris (1929–1930), 2 volumes
- Les rapports de la Grèce et de l'Égypte pendant le règne de Mohamed Aly (1833-1849), Société royale de géographie d'Égypte, Rome (1935)
