= Lambros Koromilas =

Greek economist and diplomat (c. 1856 – 1923)

- Λάμπρος Κορομηλάς
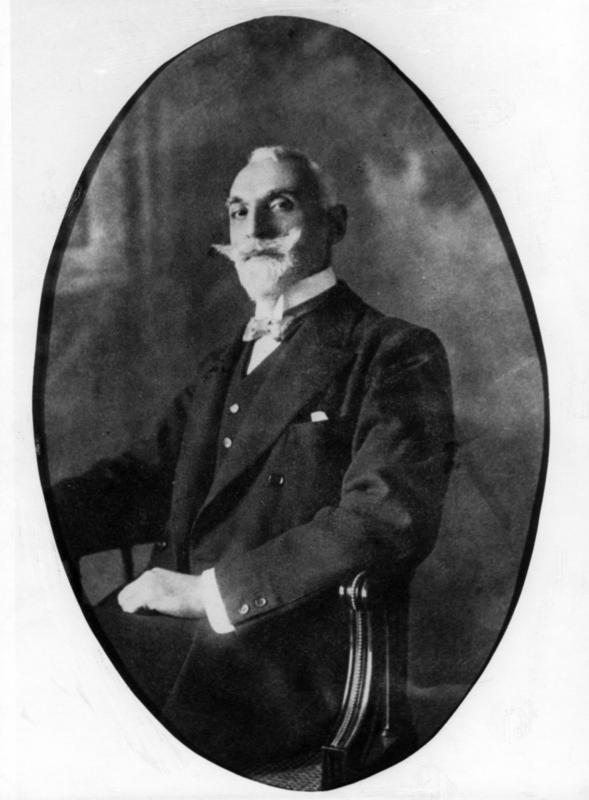
- Koromilas c. 1900s
- Born: c. 1856; Athens, Kingdom of Greece
- Died: c. 1923; New York City, United States of America
- Military career
- Allegiance: Kingdom of Greece
- Branch: Hellenic Army; HMC
- Conflicts: Greco-Turkish War (1897); Cretan Revolt; Macedonian Struggle
- Awards: Grand Commander of the Order of the Redeemer
- Other work: Finance Minister; Foreign Minister; Ambassador to Italy

Lambros Koromilas (Greek: Λάμπρος Κορομηλάς: c. 1856 – 1923) was a Greek economist and diplomat, and one of the leading figures in the Macedonian Struggle during his tenure as Greek Consul-General to Thessaloniki in 1904–1907. He also served as Finance Minister in 1910–1912 and Foreign Minister before and during the Balkan Wars of 1912–1913.

== Life ==
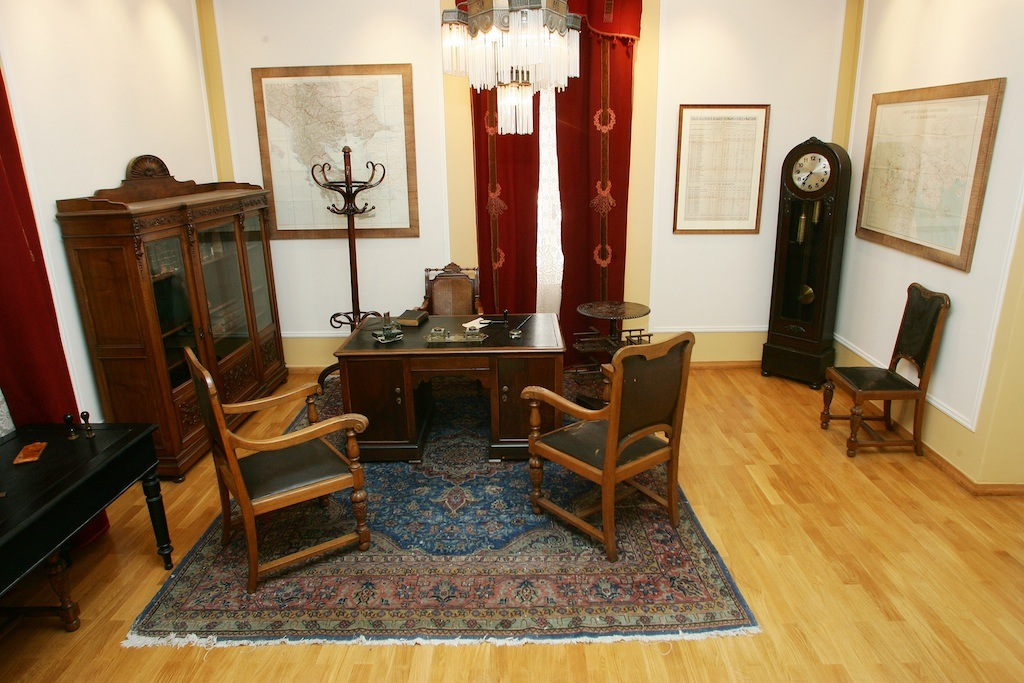
Koromilas' office in the Consulate General in Thessaloniki, now the Museum for the Macedonian Struggle.

Koromilas was born in Athens in about 1856, the second son of the publisher Andreas Koromilas. After studies in Physics and Mathematics in Athens, he continued his studies in France and Germany. On his return to Greece, he took up his father's business, but shortly after he was appointed director of the National Printing House. He later succeeded his elder brother Dimitrios (a noted theatrical writer) in running the newspaper Efimerida.

In 1888, he left Greece and went to the Ottoman capital, Constantinople, where he studied the Turkish language and the structure of the Ottoman government. On his return to Greece, he participated in the Cretan Revolt of 1896, as well as in the subsequent Greco-Turkish War of 1897. After the war, he was appointed General Secretary of the Finance Ministry, a post he held until 1899. In January 1904 he was sent as Greek consul to Philippopolis, and in May of the same year he was transferred to the Greek Consulate General in Thessaloniki. From this point he became one of the main figures of the Macedonian Struggle, the Greek effort to compete with the pro-Bulgarian Internal Macedonian Revolutionary Organization (IMRO) for the allegiance of the population of Macedonia. Koromilas's activity as the central coordinator of the Greek armed bands across Macedonia did not go unnoticed by the Ottoman government, which demanded his recall. In 1906 he was dismissed from his consular post, but appointed instead as Inspector General of the Greek consulates in Macedonia, continuing his work until his final recall under Ottoman pressure in late 1907.

Koromilas was then sent to the United States as ambassador. During his three-year tenure there he was successful in bringing unity of purpose and cohesion among the Greek immigrant organizations in the country. On his return to Greece in 1910, Koromilas resigned from the diplomatic service and entered politics. He was elected to the Hellenic Parliament in 1910 and became Finance Minister in the cabinet of Eleftherios Venizelos until 17 August 1912, when he was appointed Foreign Minister (although he already directed the ministry's affairs since 1 May). He kept his post through the Balkan Wars, and resigned on 18 August 1913 following disagreements with Venizelos.

Koromilas was then sent as ambassador to Rome, where he remained until his resignation and retirement in 1920. He then left for the United States, where he remained until his death in 1923.

== Honours and works ==
For his work in the Macedonian Struggle and later in bringing about the Balkan League, Koromilas was awarded the Grand Commander of the Order of the Redeemer. Among his numerous publications, the most important were the book Greek finances from 1848 to 1903, and the 1892 article Income and taxes.

Political offices
| Preceded by Stefanos Dragoumis | Finance Minister of Greece; 6 October 1910 – 17 August 1912 | Succeeded by Alexandros Diomidis |
| Preceded by Ioannis Gryparis | Foreign Minister of Greece; 17 August 1912 – 19 August 1913 | Succeeded by Dimitrios Panas |
