= List of diplomatic missions in Greece =

This article lists embassies and consulates posted in Greece. There are currently 86 embassies in Athens. In addition, there is a diplomatic liaison office of the Palestinian Authority, which does not have the full embassy status. Many other countries have non resident embassies or honorary consulates.

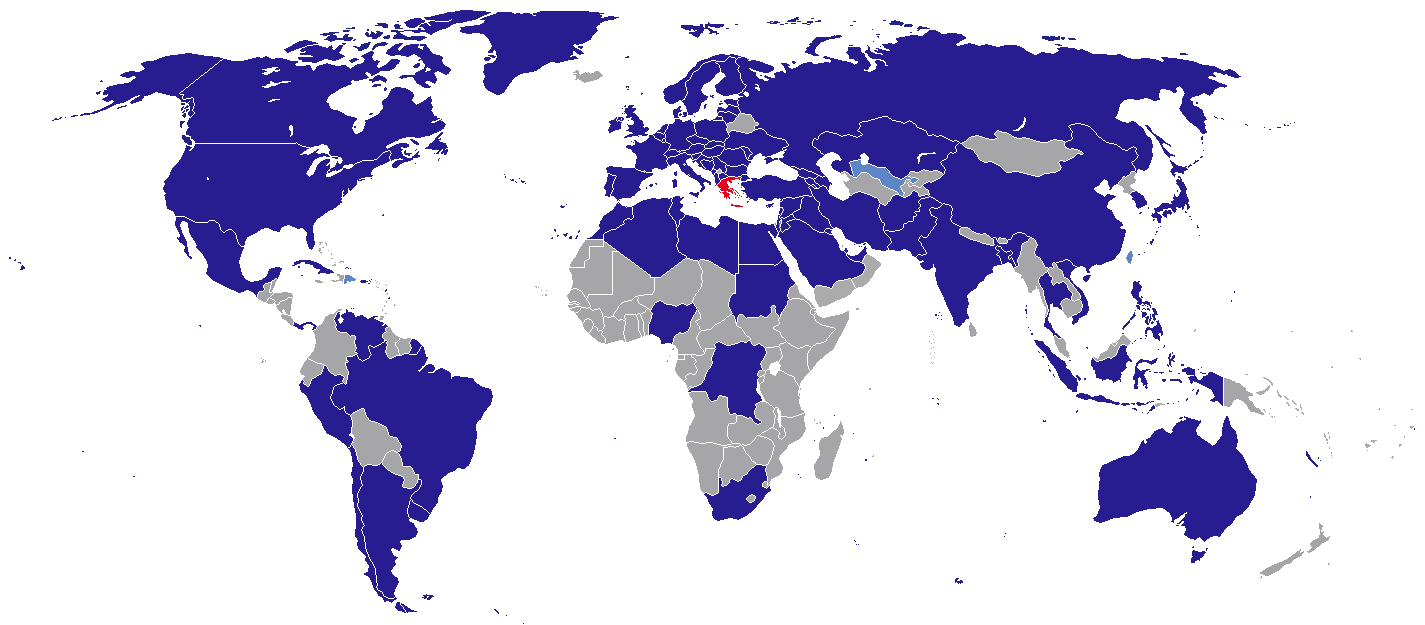
Map of diplomatic missions in Greece.

== Diplomatic missions in Athens ==
=== Embassies ===
1. Afghanistan
2. Albania
3. Algeria
4. Antigua and Barbuda
5. Argentina
6. Armenia
7. Australia
8. Austria
9. Azerbaijan
10. Bangladesh
11. Belgium
12. Bosnia and Herzegovina
13. Brazil
14. Bulgaria
15. Canada
16. Chile
17. China
18. Congo-Kinshasa
19. Croatia
20. Cuba
21. Cyprus
22. Czech Republic
23. Denmark
24. Egypt
25. Estonia
26. Finland
27. France
28. Georgia
29. Germany
30. Holy See
31. Hungary
32. India
33. Indonesia
34. Iran
35. Iraq
36. Ireland
37. Israel
38. Italy
39. Japan
40. Jordan
41. Kazakhstan
42. Kuwait
43. Latvia
44. Lebanon
45. Libya
46. Lithuania
47. Luxembourg
48. Malta
49. Mexico
50. Moldova
51. Montenegro
52. Morocco
53. Netherlands
54. Nigeria
55. North Macedonia
56. Norway
57. Pakistan
58. Panama
59. Peru
60. Philippines
61. Poland
62. Portugal
63. Qatar
64. Romania
65. Russia
66. Saudi Arabia
67. Serbia
68. Slovakia
69. Slovenia
70. South Africa
71. South Korea
72. Spain
73. Sudan
74. Sweden
75. Switzerland
76. Syria
77. Thailand
78. Tunisia
79. Turkey
80. Ukraine
81. United Arab Emirates
82. United Kingdom
83. United States
84. Uruguay
85. Venezuela
86. Vietnam

=== Other posts and representative offices ===
- Abkhazia (Representative Office)
- Palestine (Diplomatic Delegation)
- Sahrawi Republic (Representative Office)
- Taiwan (Taipei Representative Office)

=== Gallery ===
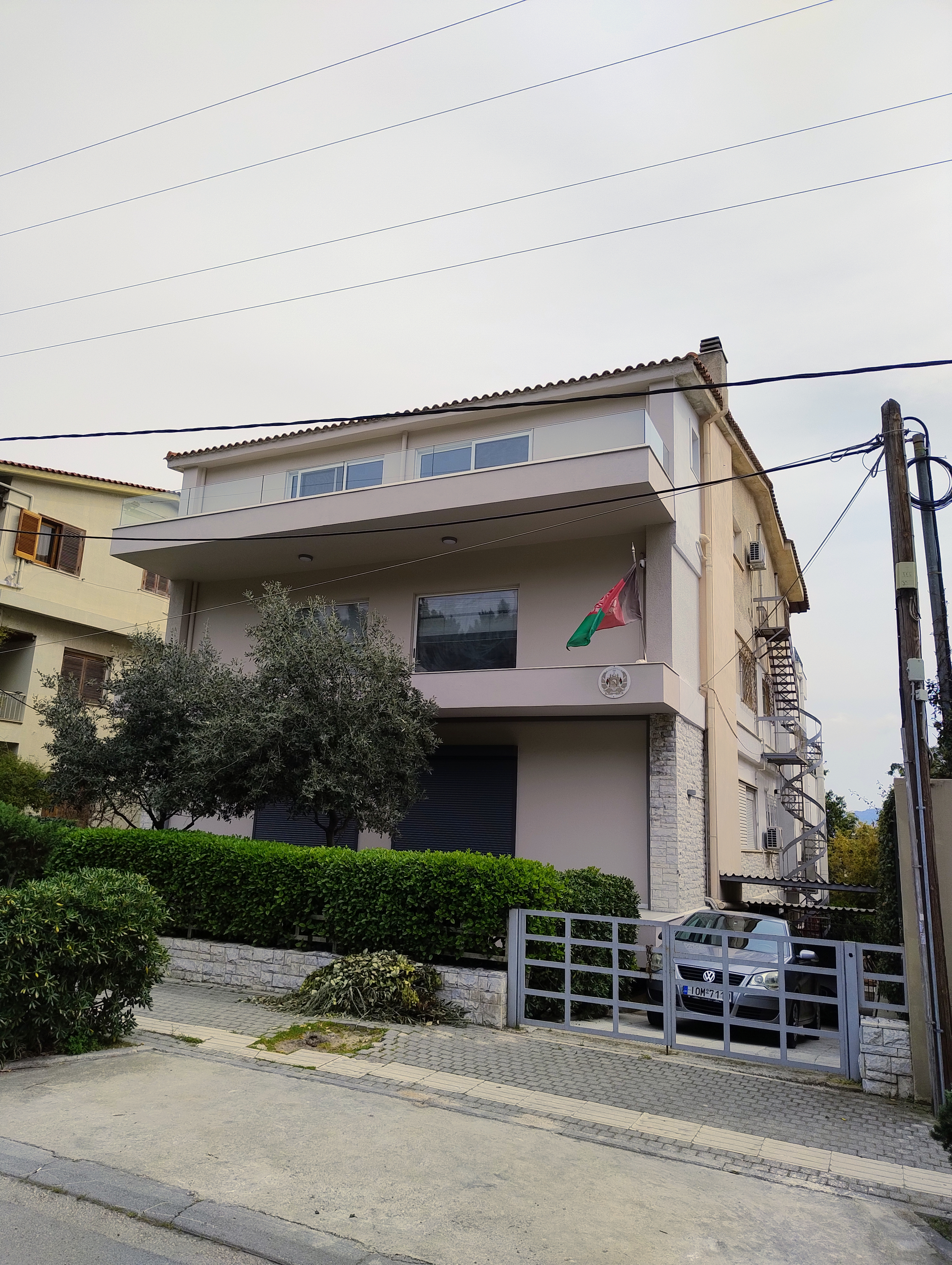
Embassy of Afghanistan

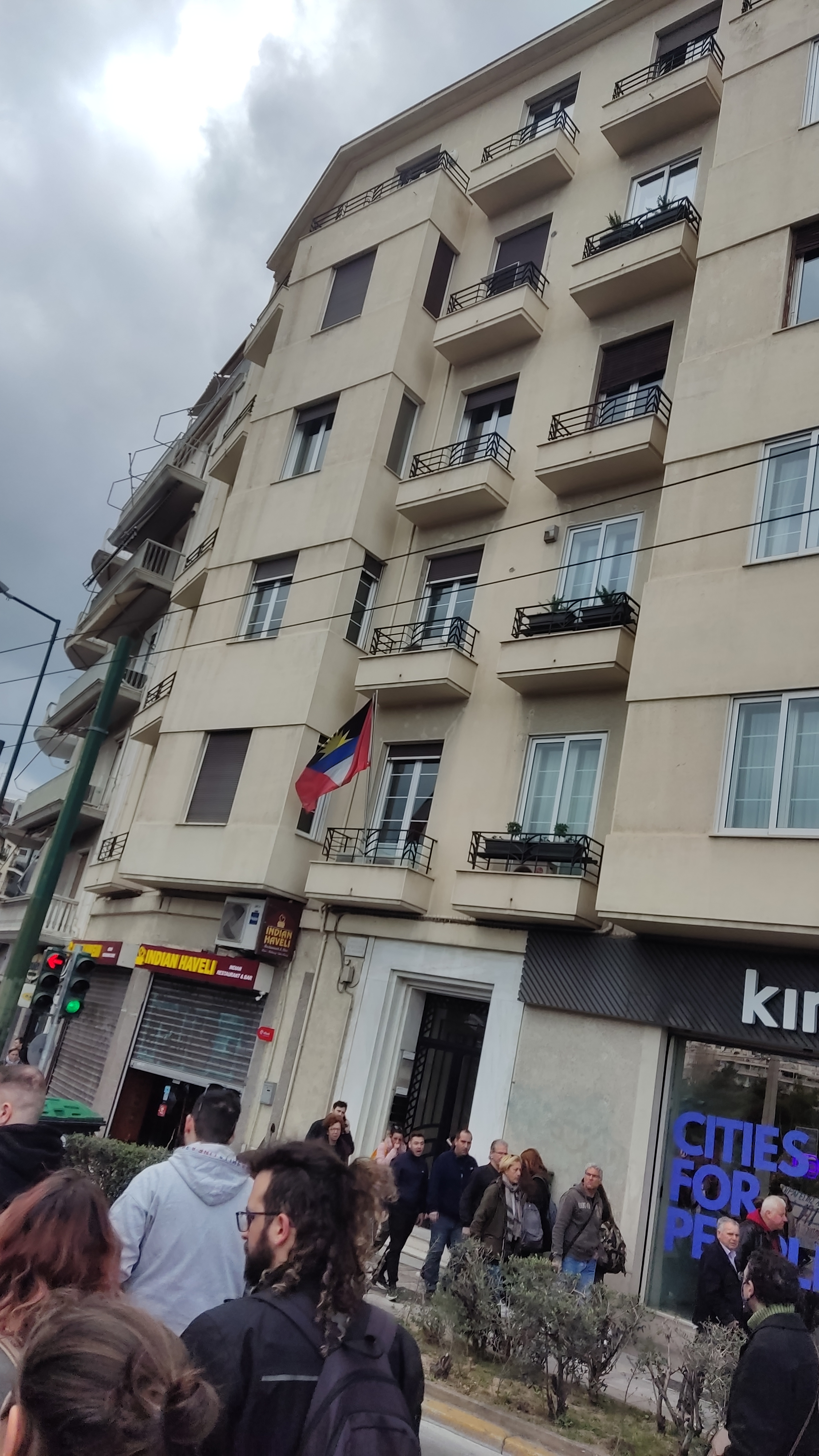
Embassy of Antigua and Barbuda

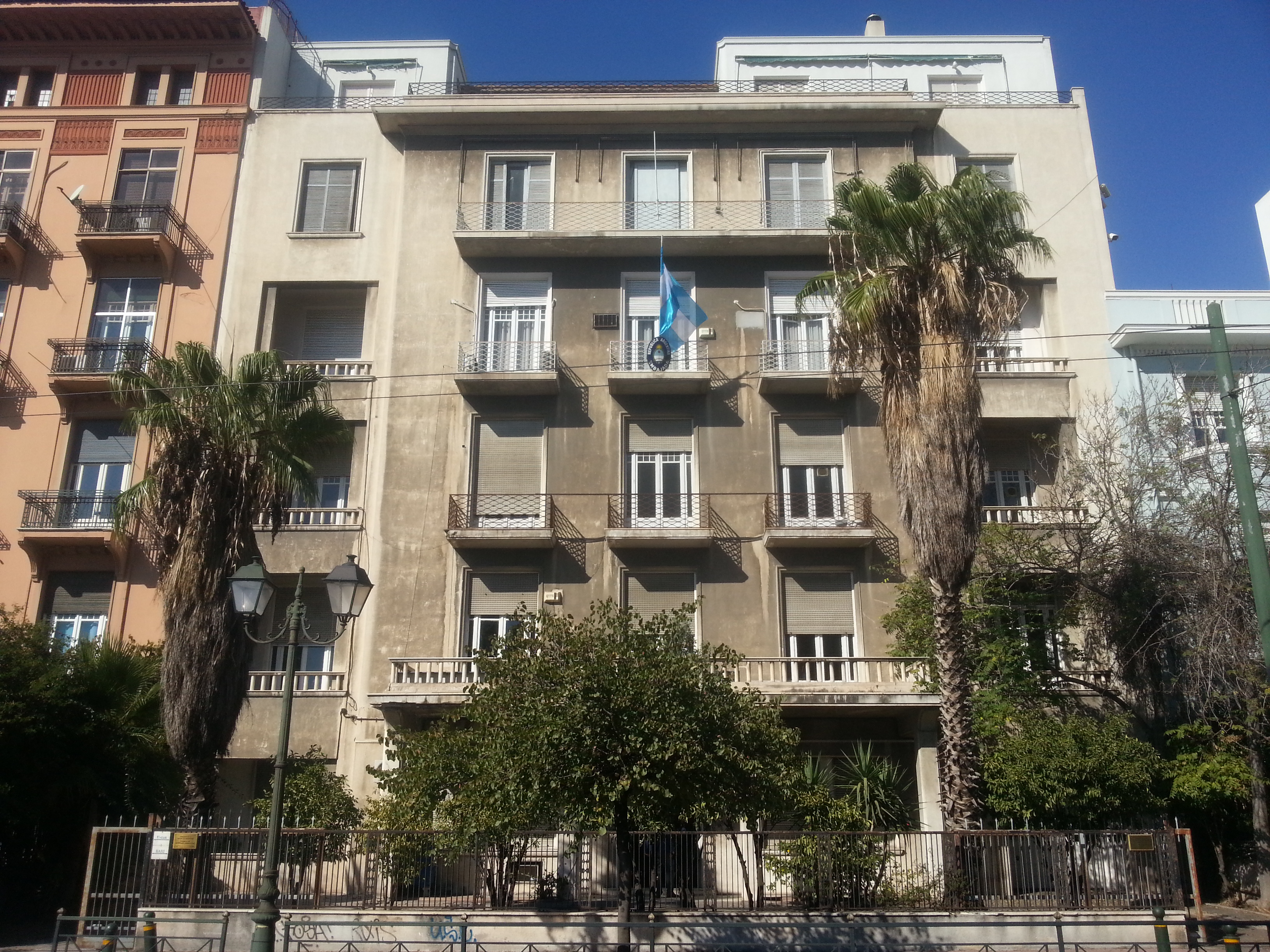
Embassy of Argentina

Embassy of Azerbaijan

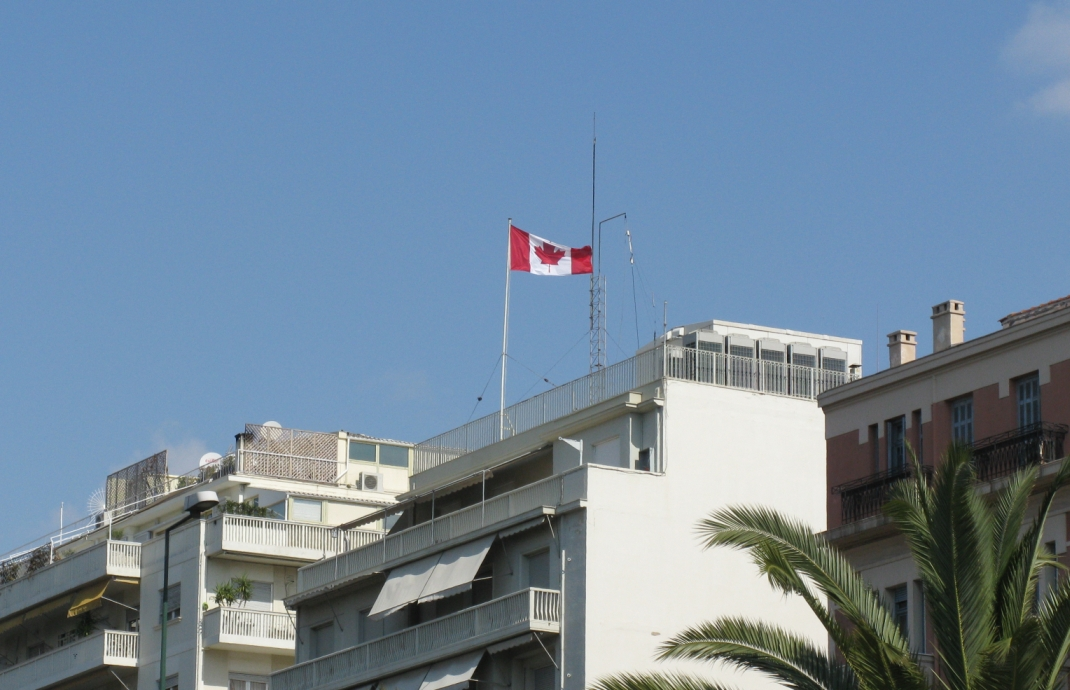
Embassy of Canada

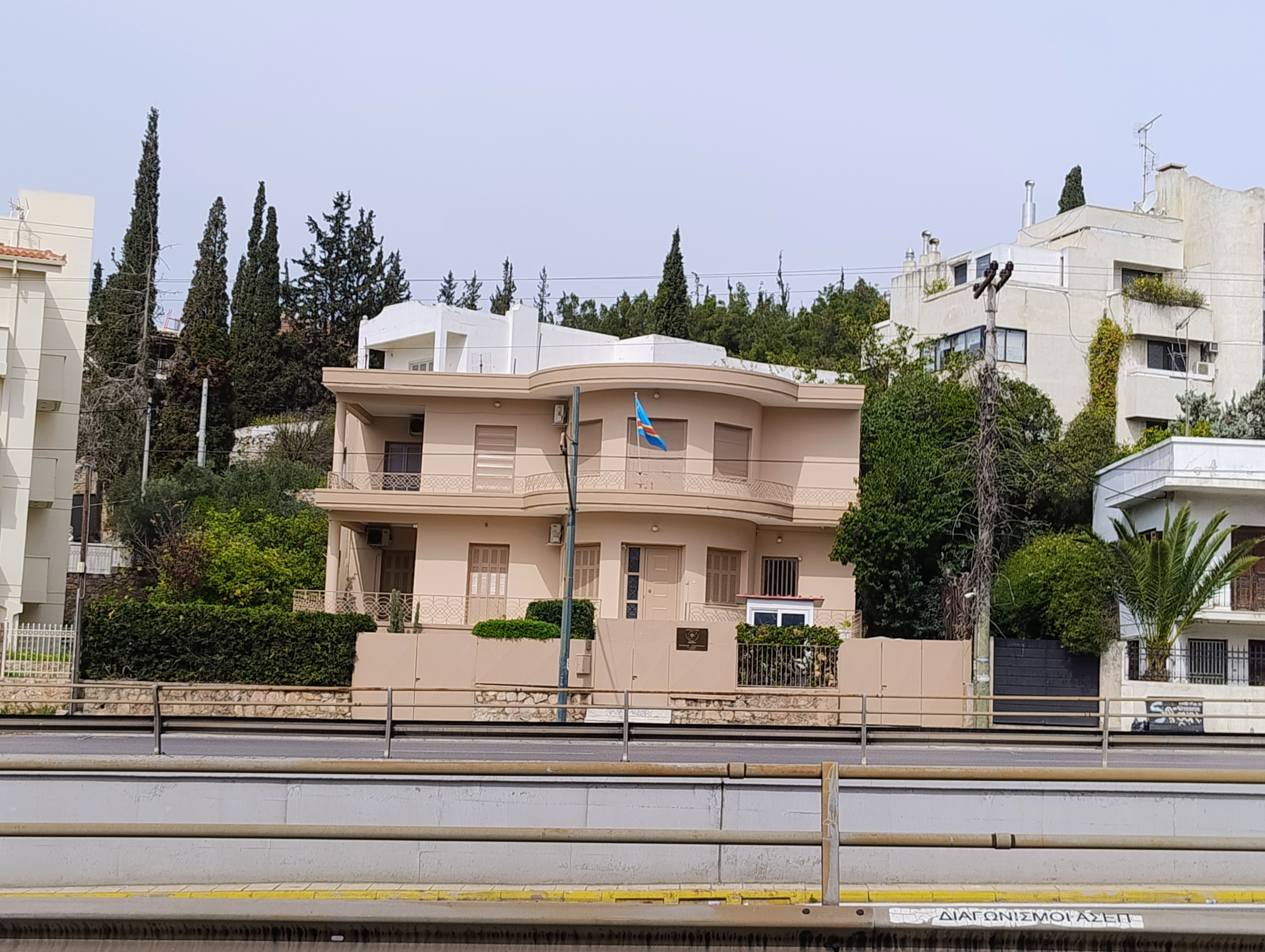
Embassy of DR Congo

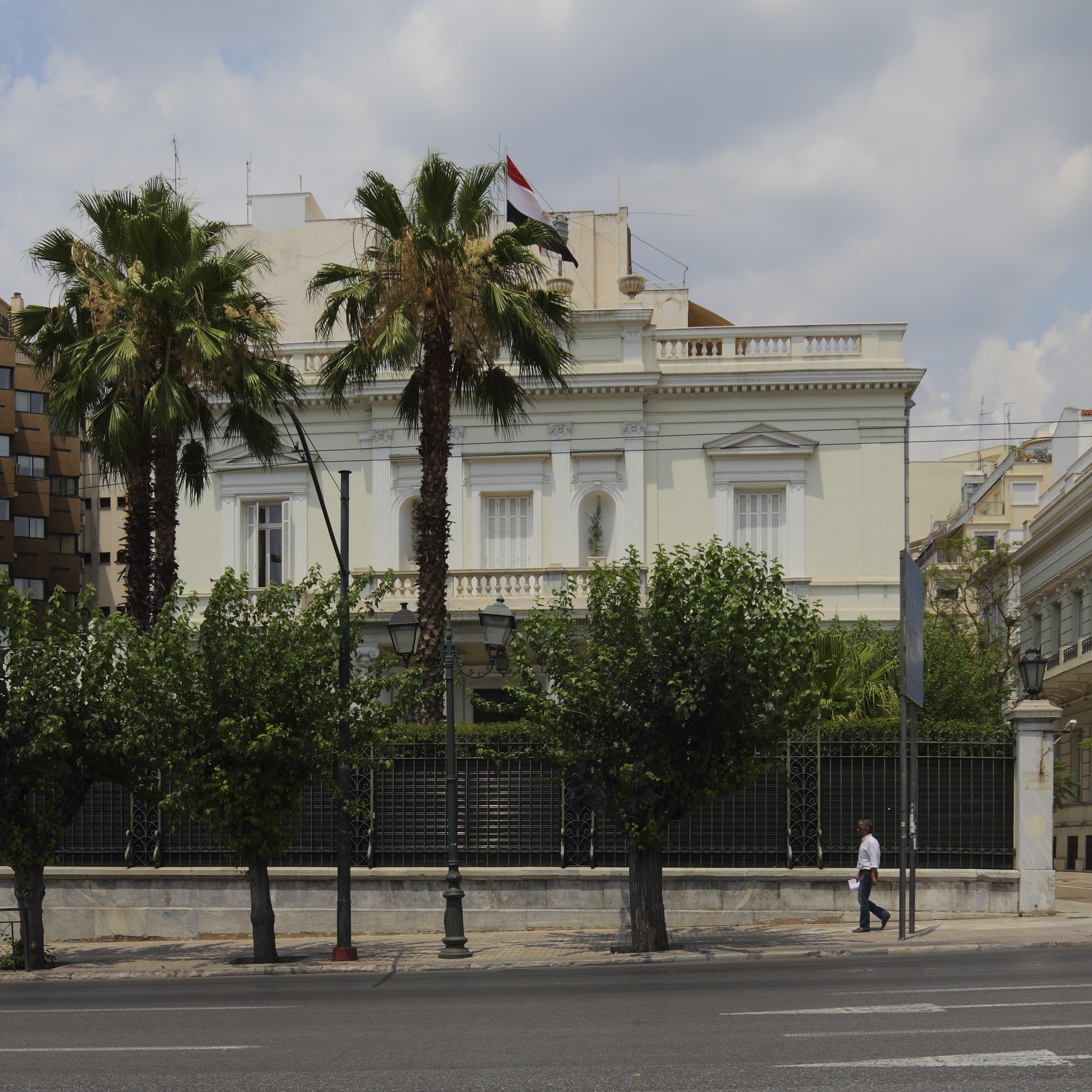
Embassy of Egypt

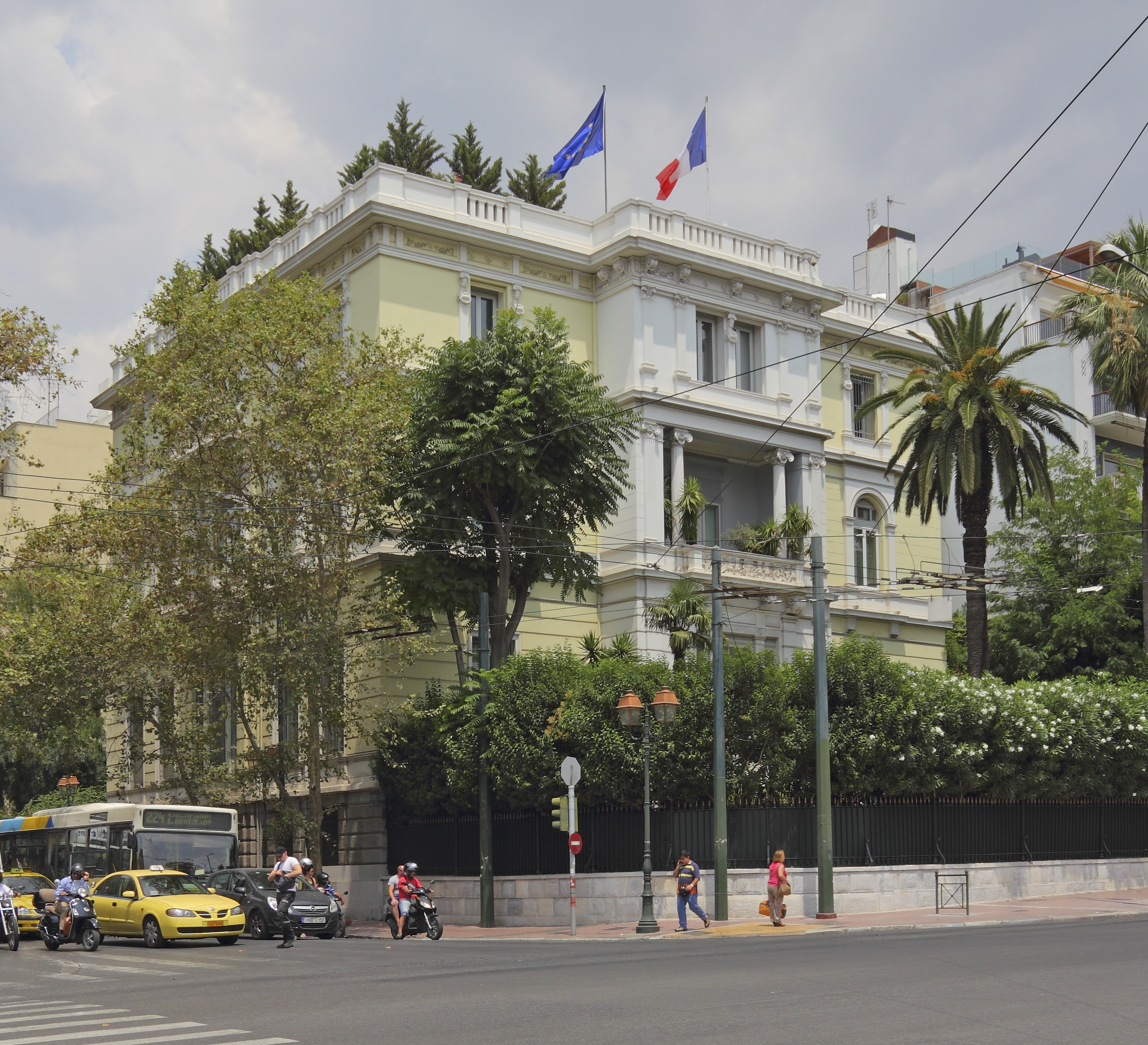
Embassy of France

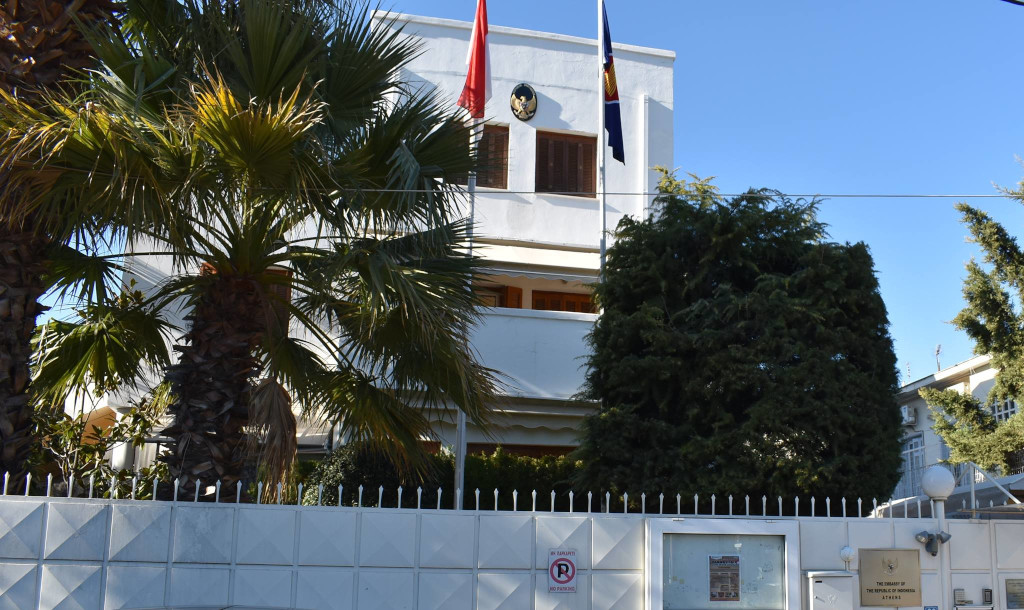
Embassy of Indonesia

Embassies of Ireland, Netherlands and Sweden

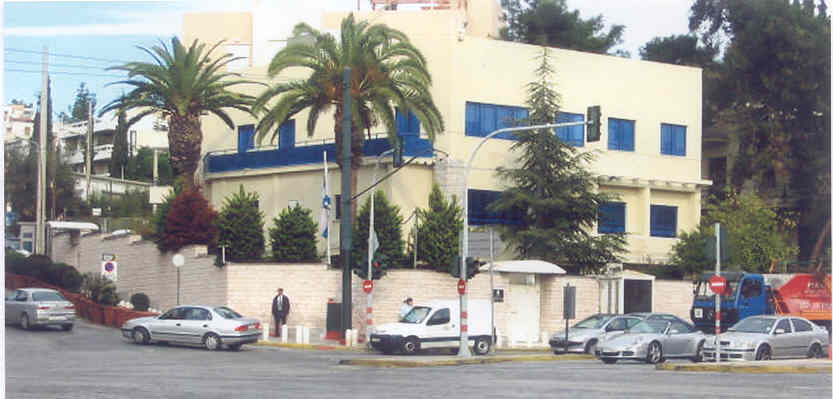
Embassy of Israel

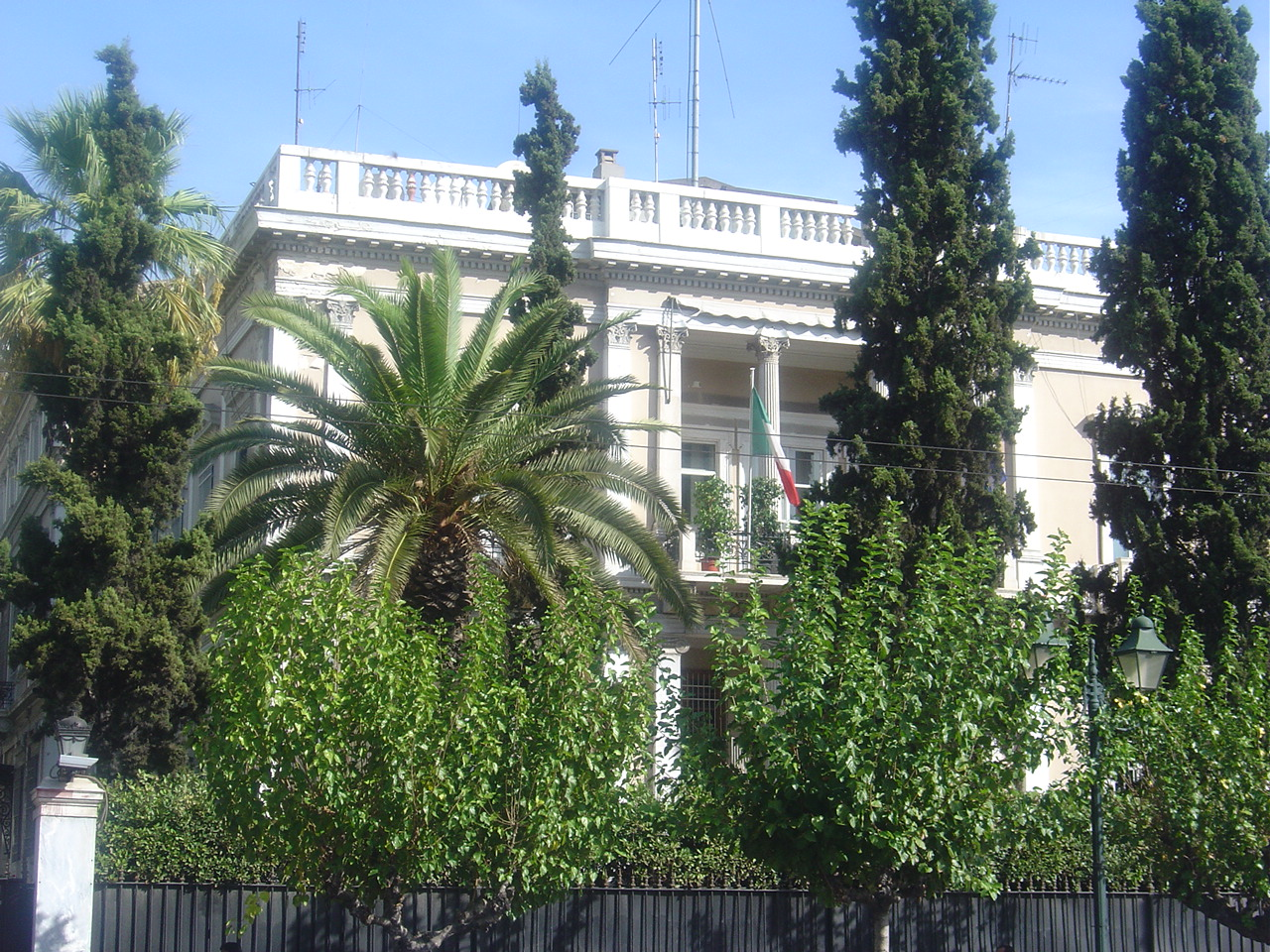
Embassy of Italy

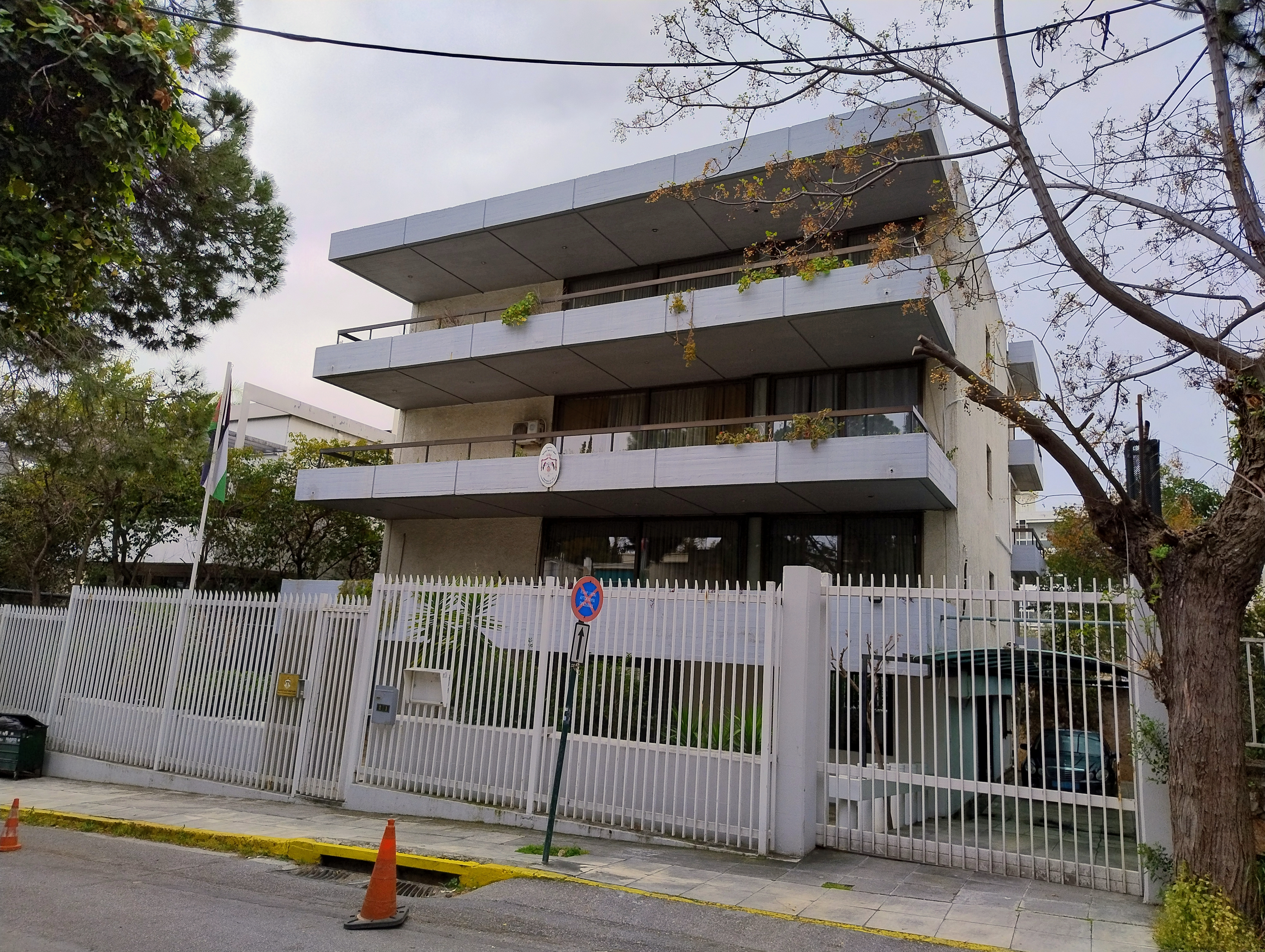
Embassy of Jordan

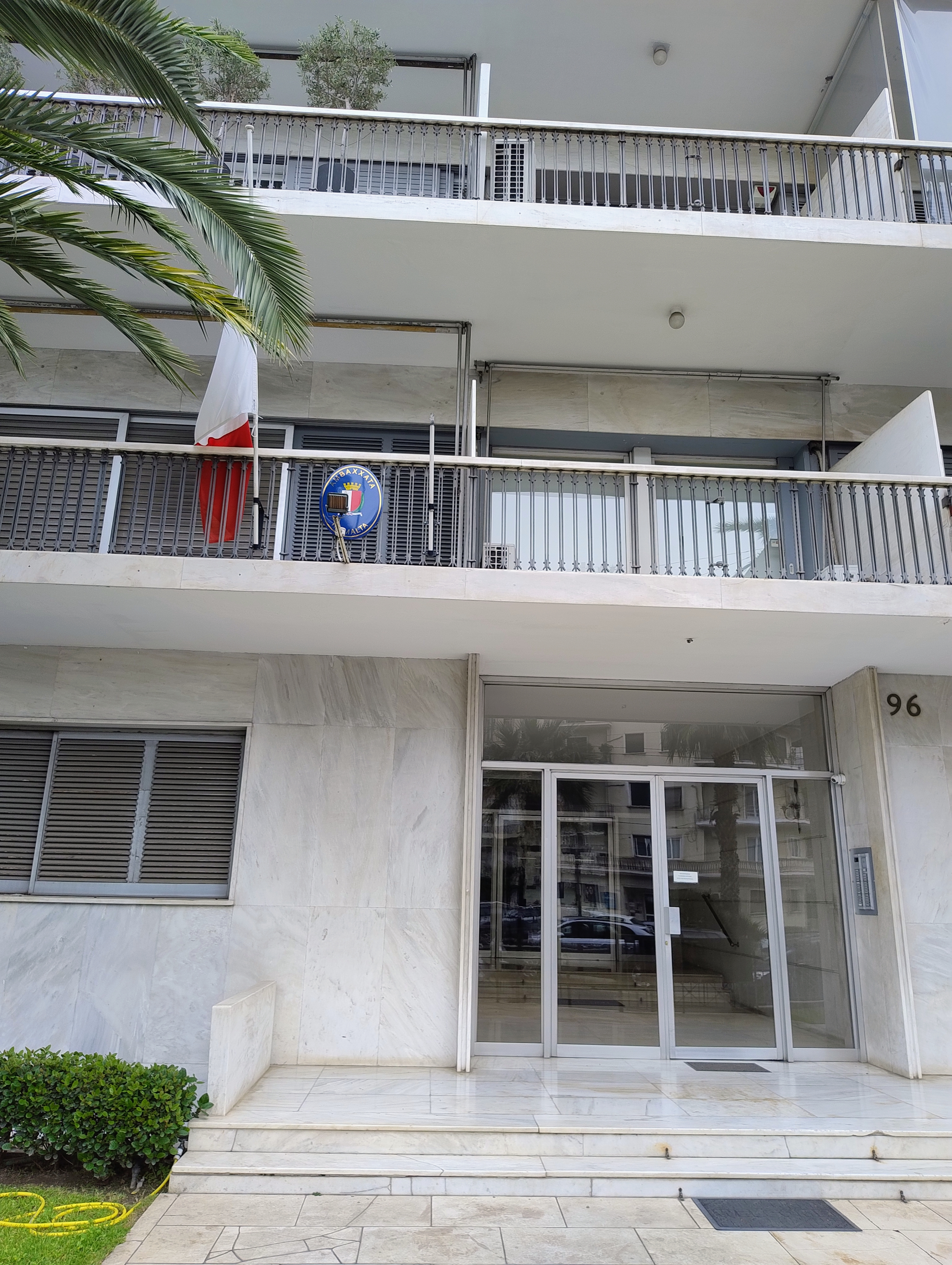
Embassy of Malta

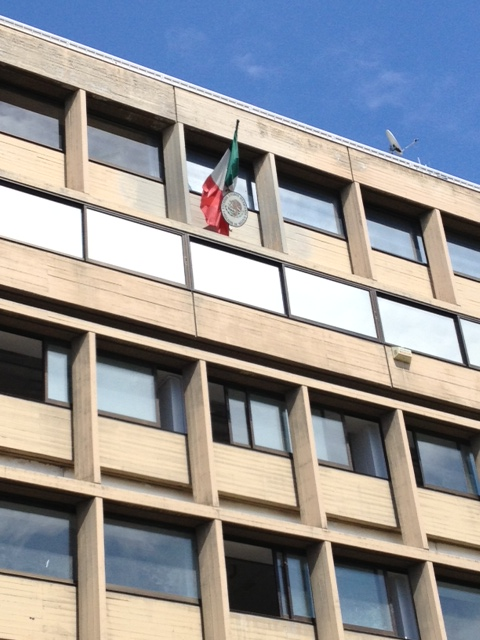
Embassy of Mexico

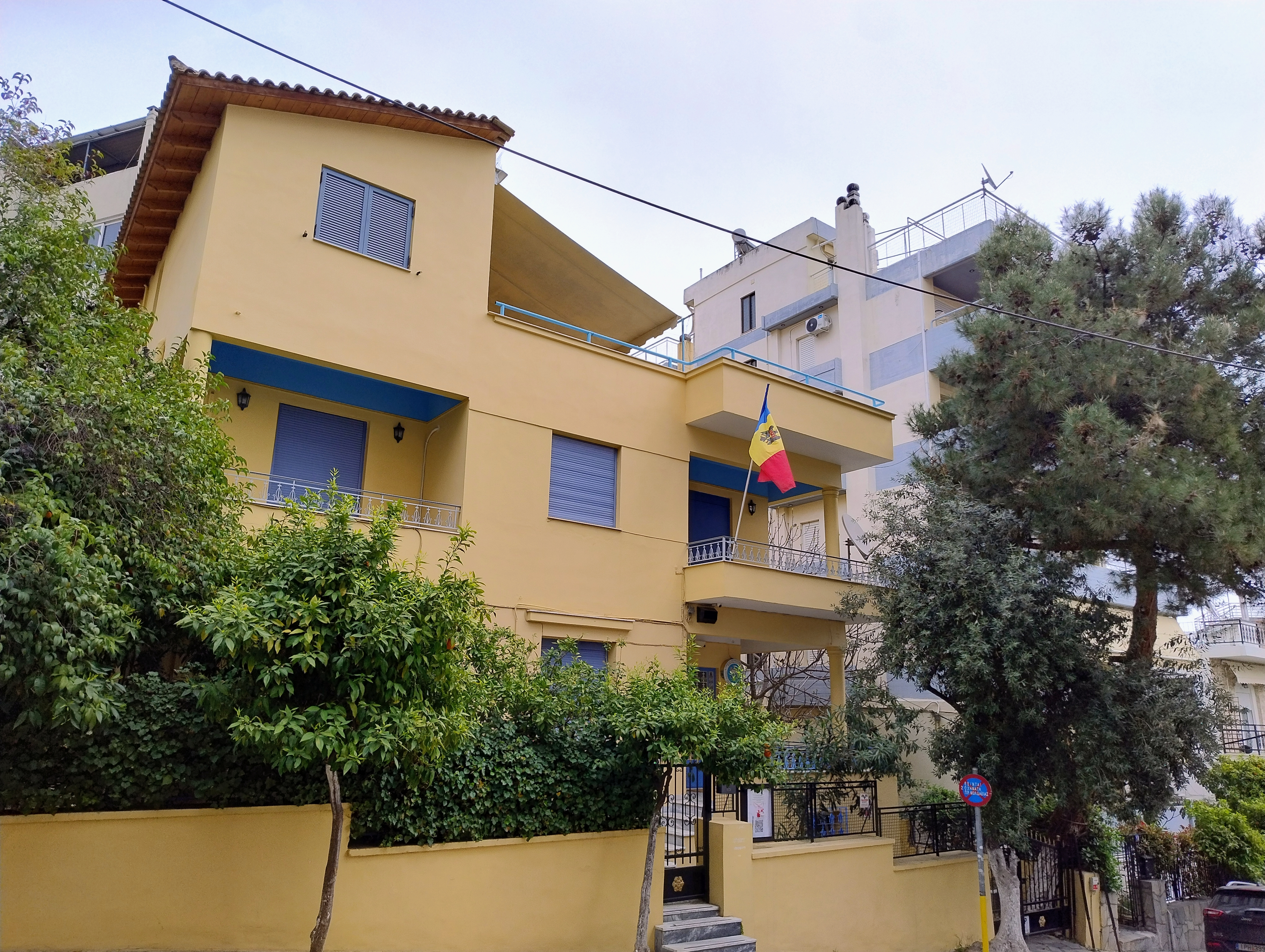
Embassy of Moldova

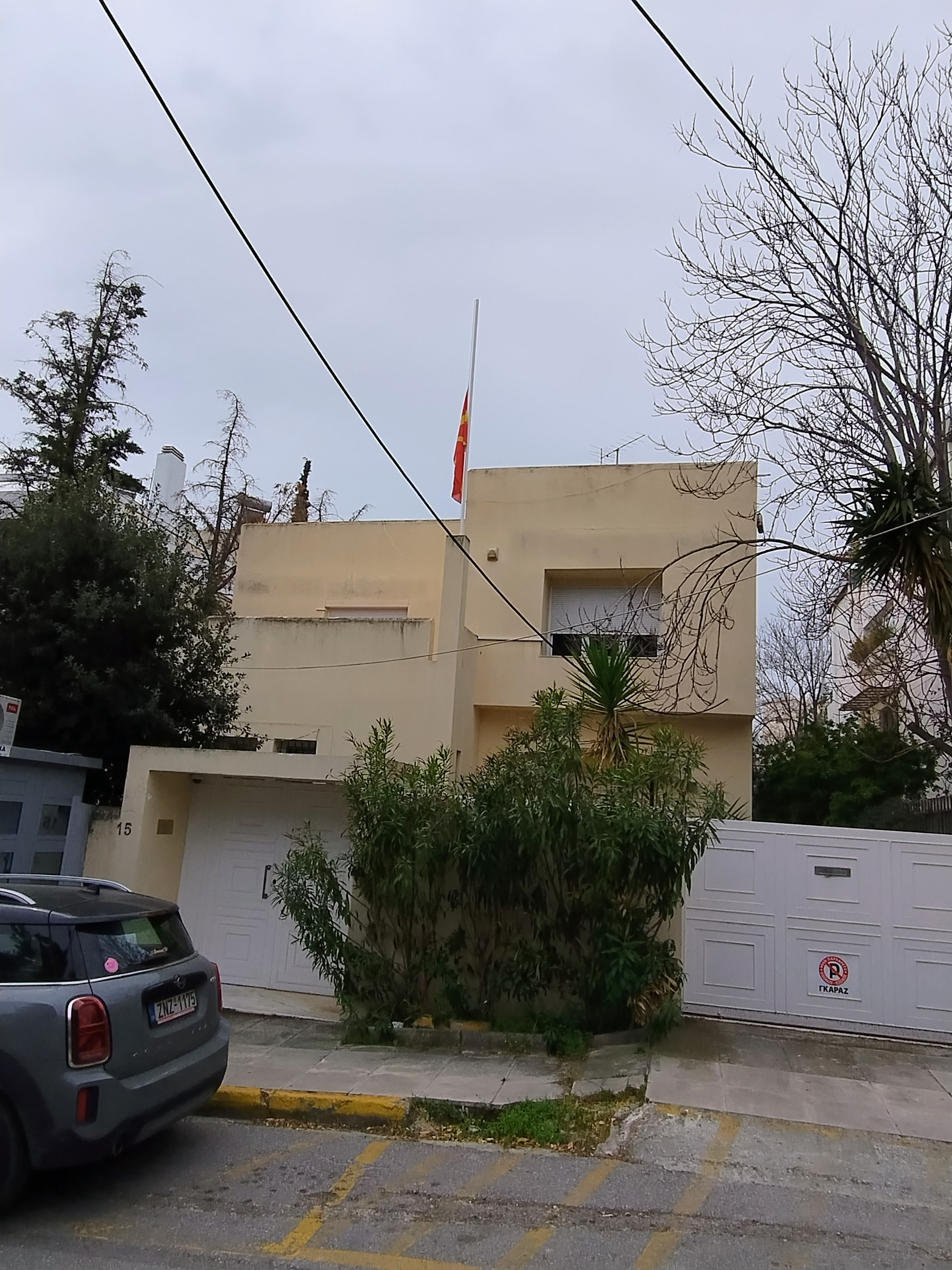
Embassy of North Macedonia

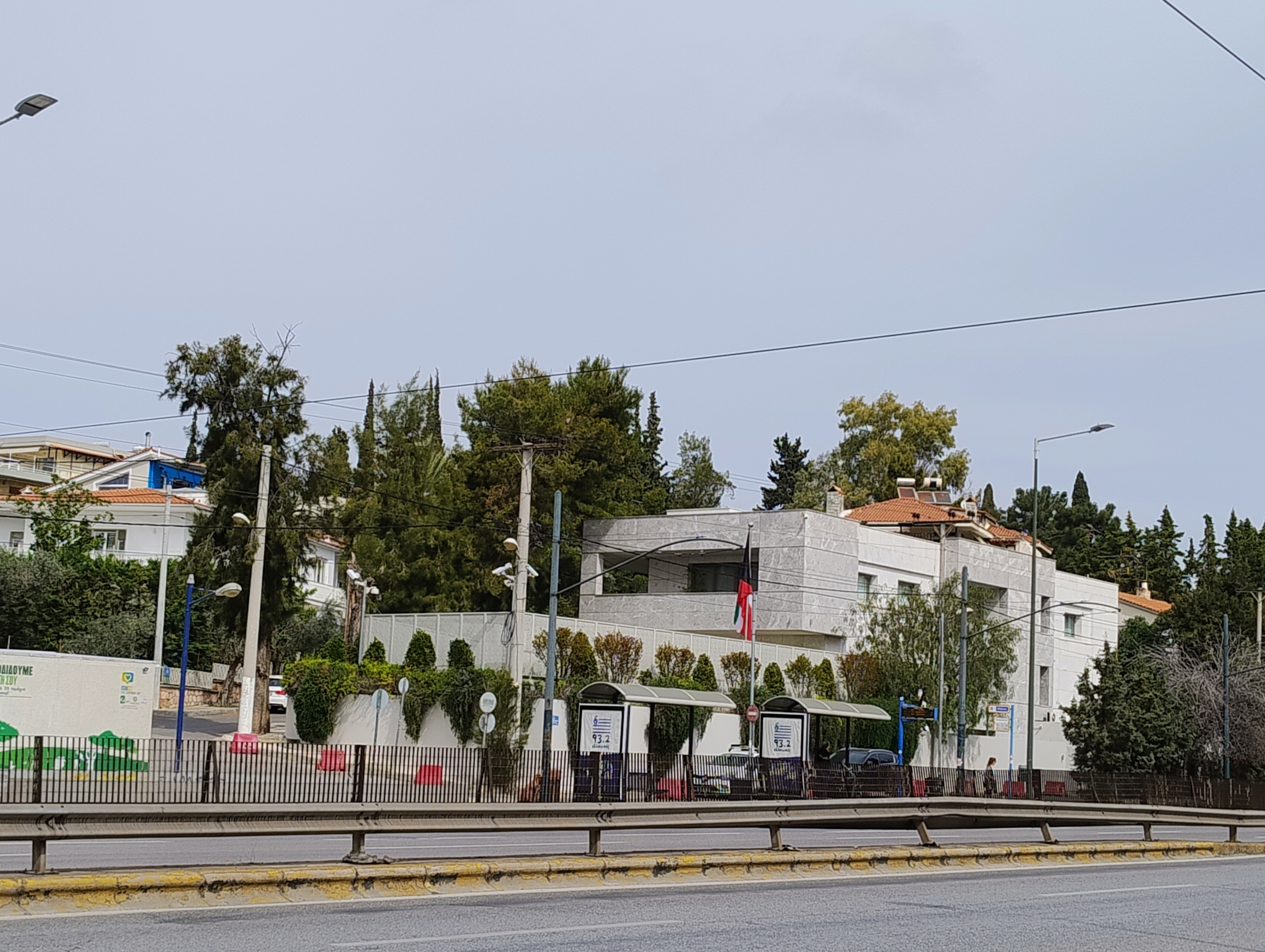
Mission of Palestine

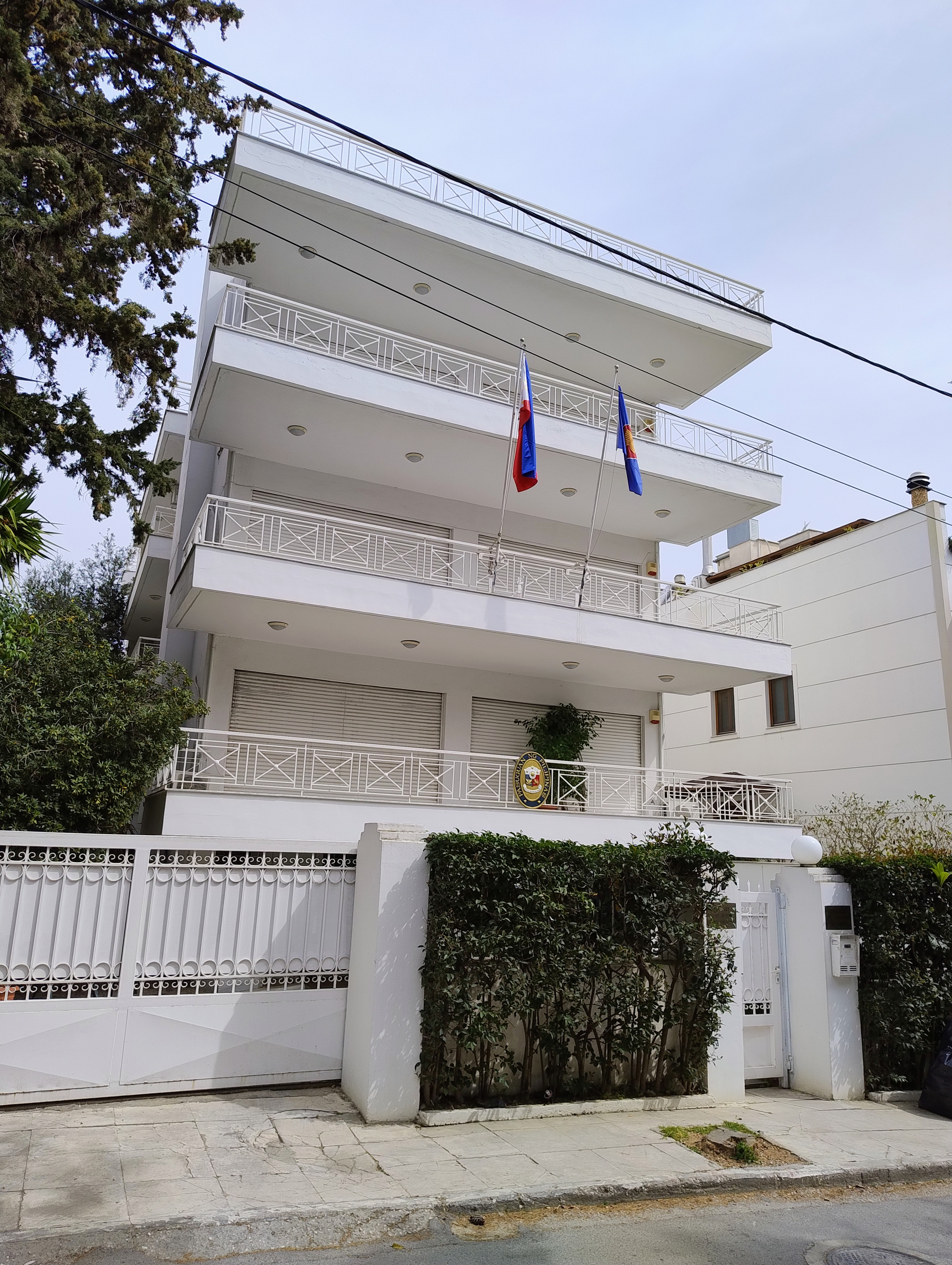
Embassy of the Philippines

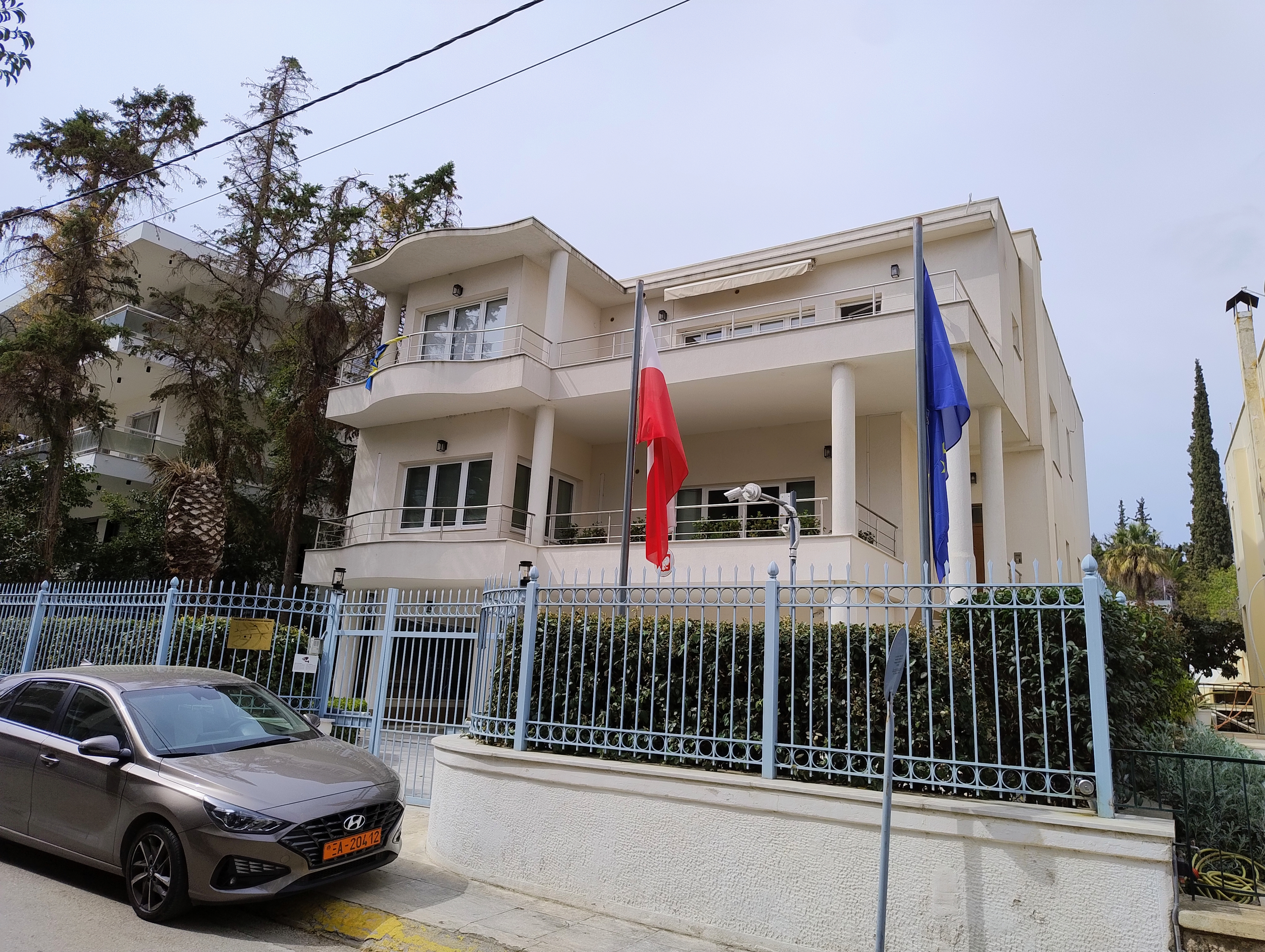
Embassy of Poland

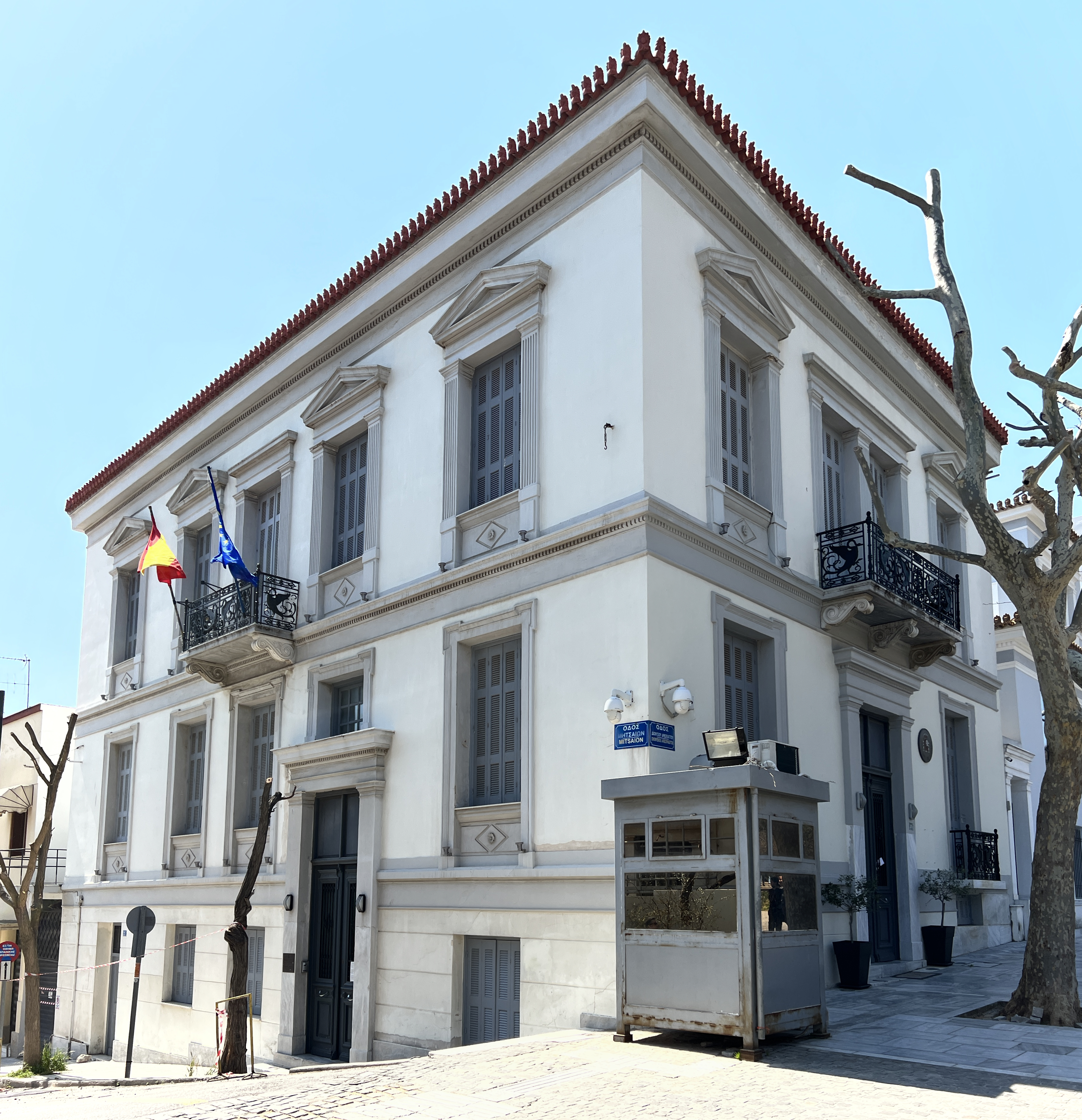
Embassy of Spain

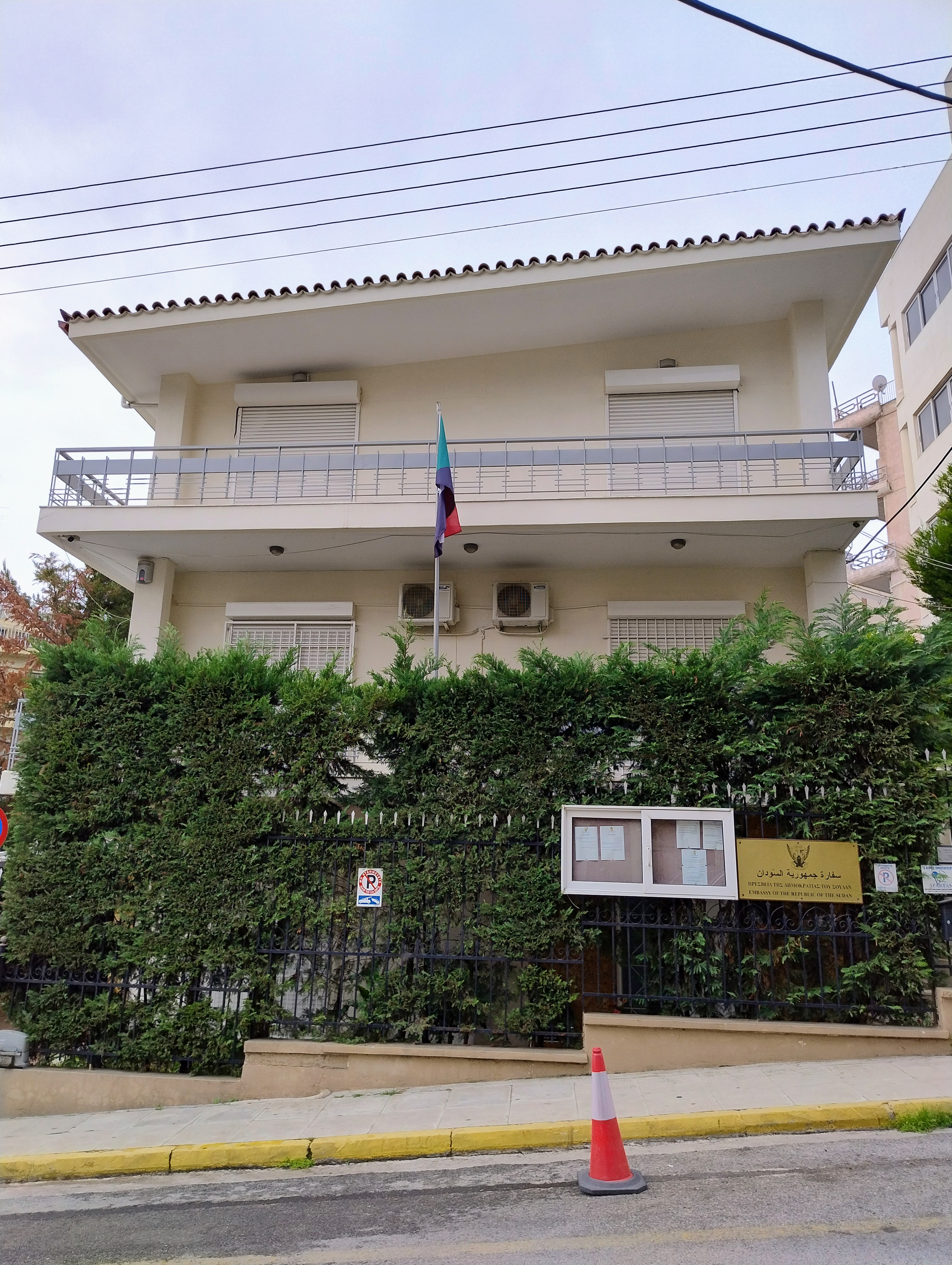
Embassy of Sudan

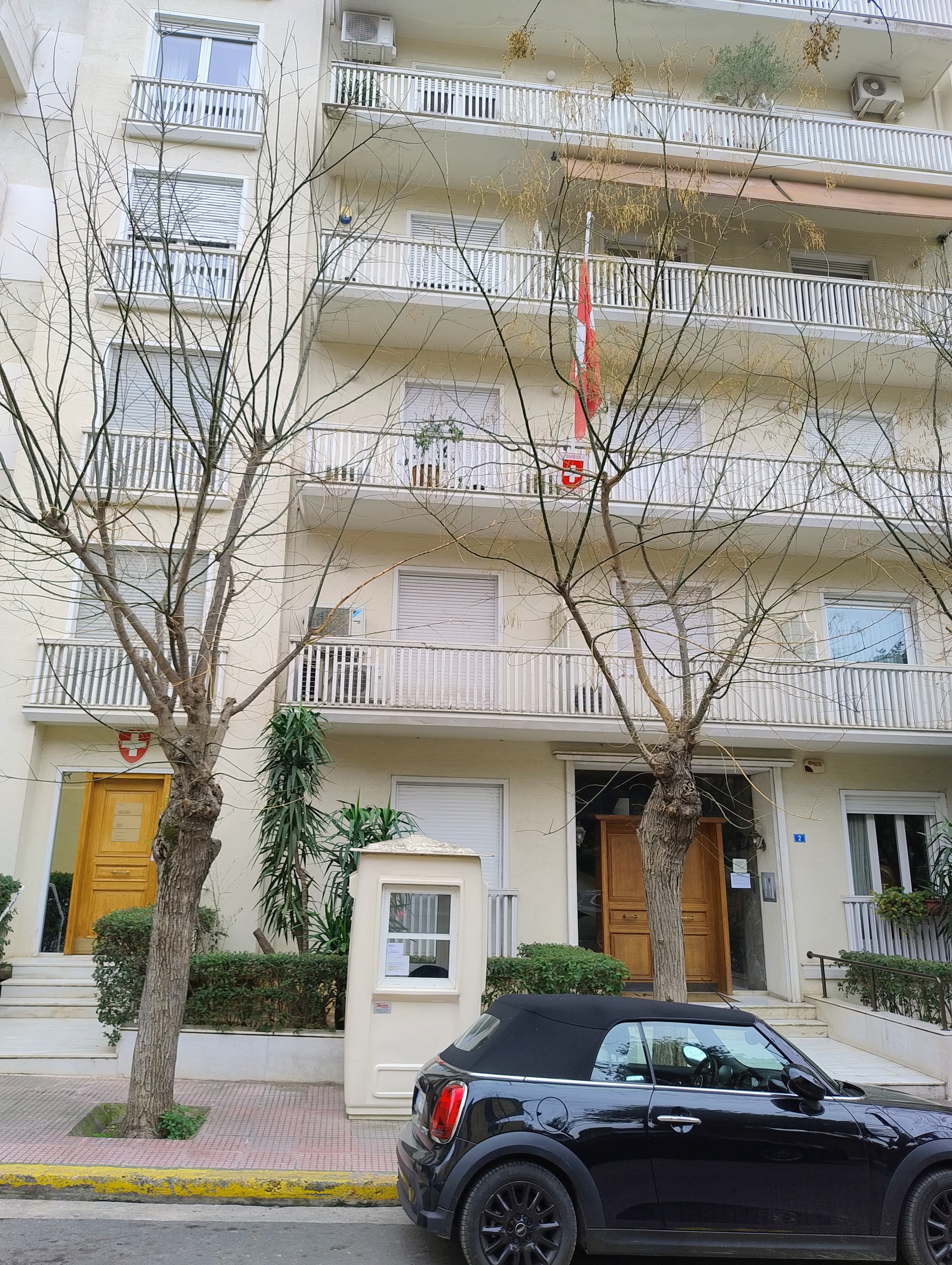
Embassy of Switzerland

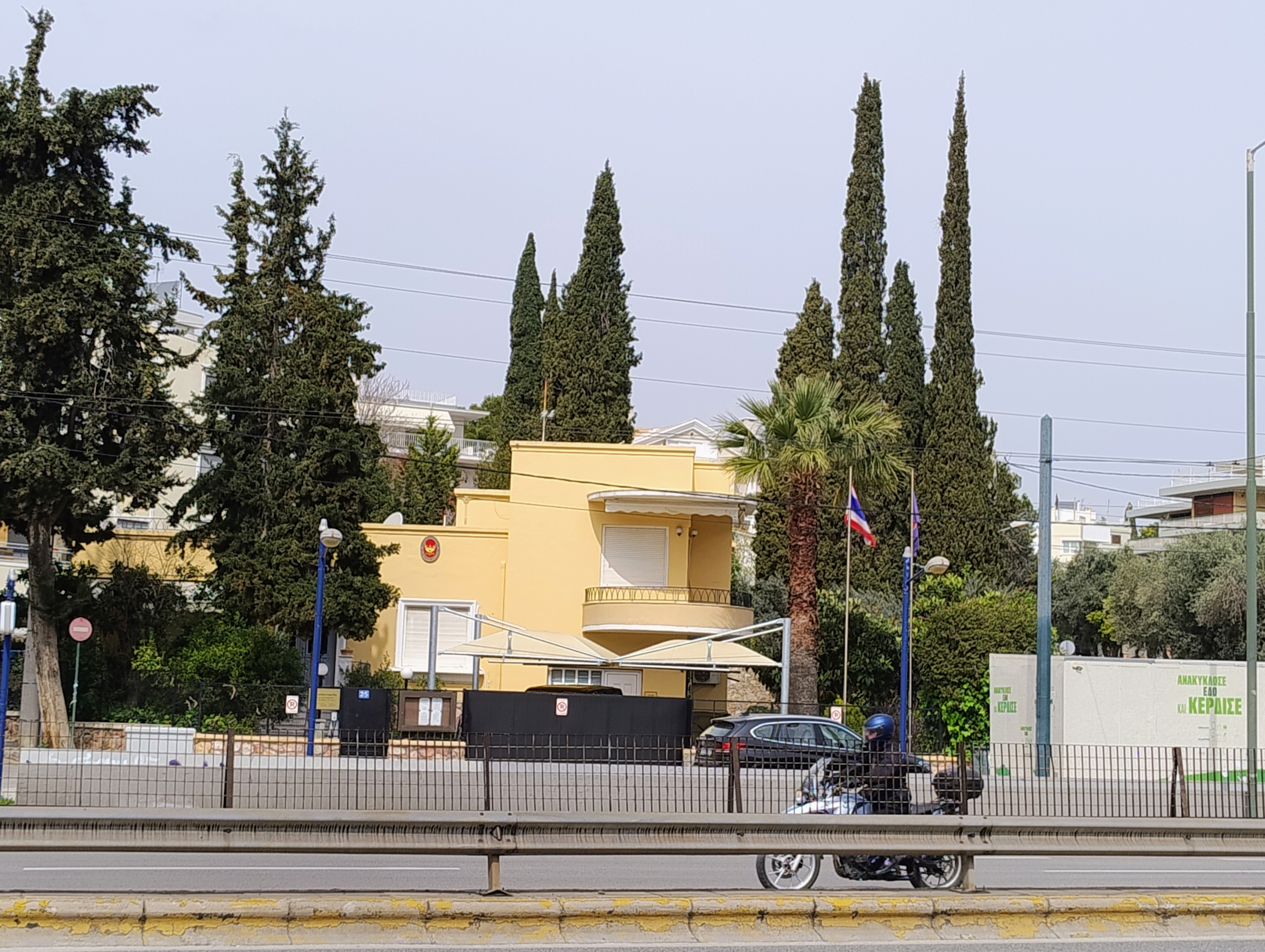
Embassy of Thailand

Embassy of Ukraine

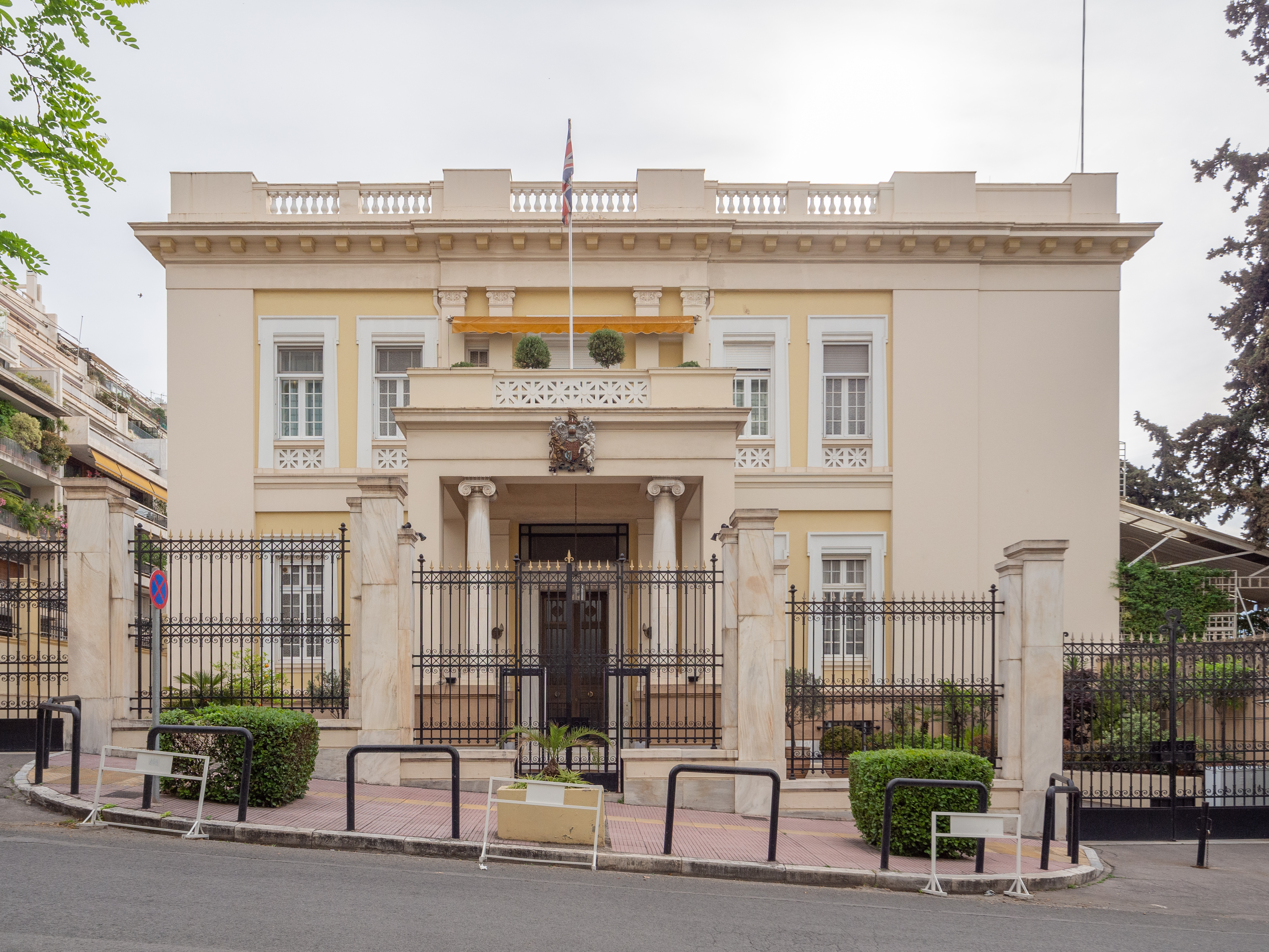
Embassy of the United Kingdom

Embassy of the United States

== Consular Missions ==
All listed missions herein are consulates-general, unless labelled otherwise.

=== Athens ===
- Dominican Republic
- Uzbekistan

=== Corfu ===
- United Kingdom (Vice-Consulate)

=== Thessaloniki ===
- Albania
- Bulgaria
- Cyprus
- France
- Germany
- Georgia
- Japan
- North Macedonia
- Romania
- Russia
- Serbia
- Turkey
- Ukraine
- United States

=== Heraklion ===
- United Kingdom (Vice-Consulate)

=== Ioannina ===
- Albania

=== Komotini ===
- Turkey

=== Piraeus ===
- Turkey

=== Rhodes ===
- Turkey
- United Kingdom (Vice-Consulate)

=== Zakynthos ===
- United Kingdom (Vice-Consulate)

== Non-resident embassies accredited to Greece ==
=== Resident in Brussels, Belgium ===
1. Fiji
2. Mauritius
3. Papua New Guinea
4. Sierra Leone

=== Resident in Geneva, Switzerland ===
1. Botswana
2. Burundi
3. Jamaica
4. Laos

=== Resident in London, United Kingdom ===
1. Bahamas
2. Brunei
3. Namibia
4. Eswatini

=== Resident in Paris, France ===
1. Central African Republic
2. Chad
3. Liberia
4. Togo

=== Resident in Rome, Italy ===
==== Accredited to the Holy See ====
1. Bolivia
2. Ghana
3. Guatemala

==== Accredited to Italy ====
1. Angola
2. Burkina Faso
3. Cape Verde
4. Colombia
5. Congo-Brazzaville
6. Dominican Republic
7. Ecuador
8. El Salvador
9. Ethiopia
10. Guinea
11. Ivory Coast
12. Kenya
13. Lesotho
14. Mali
15. Mauritania
16. Mozambique
17. Myanmar
18. New Zealand
19. Niger
20. Oman
21. Paraguay
22. Senegal
23. South Sudan
24. Sri Lanka
25. Tanzania
26. Turkmenistan
27. Uganda
28. Uzbekistan
29. Yemen
30. Zambia
31. Zimbabwe

=== Resident in Sofia, Bulgaria ===
1. Belarus
2. Cambodia
3. Mongolia

=== Resident elsewhere ===
1. Andorra (Andorra la Vella)
2. Bahrain (Tel Aviv)
3. Dominica (Roseau)
4. Gambia (Madrid)
5. Iceland (Oslo)
6. Malaysia (Bucharest)
7. Nepal (Vienna)
8. Nicaragua (Madrid)
9. Rwanda (Tel Aviv)
10. San Marino (Strasbourg)
11. Singapore (Singapore)

== Former embassies ==
- Angola (Note: Resident in Rome, Lazio, Italy)
- Ethiopia(closed in 2010)
- New Zealand

== See also ==
- Visa requirements for Greek citizens
