= Taipei Representative Office, Athens =

Unofficial diplomatic mission

Taipei Representative Office in Greece 駐希臘臺北代表處 Γραφείο Αντιπροσωπείας της Ταϊπέι στην Ελλάδα
Agency overview
- Formed: January 1973 (as Far East Trade Center)
- Jurisdiction: Greece; Bulgaria; Cyprus
- Headquarters: Leof. Marathonodromon 57, Psychiko, Athens, Greece
- Agency executive: Calvin Chen-Huan Ho, Representative
- Website: Taipei Representative Office in Greece

The Taipei Representative Office in Greece (Chinese: 駐希臘臺北代表處) (Greek: Γραφείο Αντιπροσωπείας της Ταϊπέι στην Ελλάδα) represents the interests of Taiwan in Greece in the absence of formal diplomatic relations, functioning as a de facto embassy.

== Background ==
The aim of the representative office is to further bilateral cooperation between Greece and Taiwan in the fields of economics, culture, education and research. In addition, it offers consular services and the consular jurisdiction of the office also extends to Bulgaria and Cyprus.

On 6 January 1973, the Republic of China established the Far East Trade Center in Athens, Greece. On 28 December 1990, it was renamed the Taipei Economic and Cultural Office in Greece, which has the function of a de facto embassy. On 11 April 2003, it was renamed the Taipei Representative Office in Greece, within the consular affairs and economic group.

Since September 2016, the office is headed by a representative, currently Calvin Ho (何震寰) , who is Ministry of Foreign Affairs Bureau of Consular Affairs Director-General in Taiwan.

== See also ==
- Greece–Taiwan relations
- List of diplomatic missions of Taiwan
- List of diplomatic missions in Greece
