= Greece–Turkey border =

International border

Greece–Turkey border Σύνορα Ελλάδας–Τουρκίας Türkiye–Yunanistan sınırı
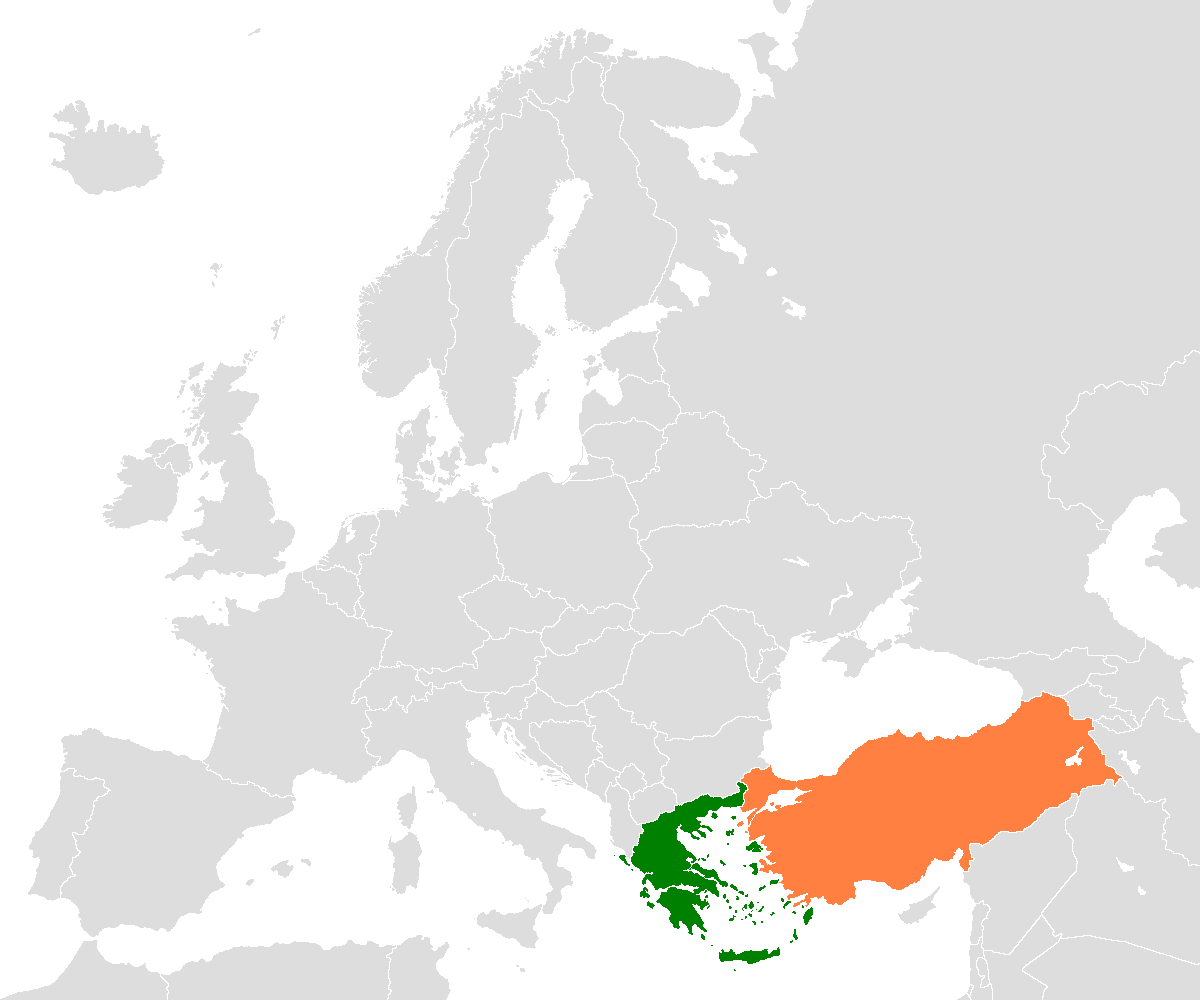

Characteristics
- Entities: Greece Turkey
- Length: 212 km (132 mi)

Greece–Turkey land border

The Greece–Turkey border (Greek: Σύνορα Ελλάδας–Τουρκίας, romanized: Sýnora Elládas–Tourkías, Turkish: Türkiye–Yunanistan sınırı) is around 200 kilometres (120 mi) long, and separates Western Thrace in Greece from East Thrace in Turkey.

== Course ==
It mostly follows the river Evros. At some places the border does not follow the main course of the river, mainly because the river has been straightened.

== Barrier ==
It is the external border of the European Union. In 2012, a high border fence was erected along the land border where it is not separated by the river, because of the European migrant crisis. In addition there is a sea border which sometimes goes through straits of a few kilometres width.

== Aegean dispute ==
Between the two countries, there are political disputes over several aspects of political control over the Aegean space, including the size of territorial waters, air control and the delimitation of economic rights to the continental shelf. These issues are known as the Aegean dispute, a series of crises that began in 1976 and continued with further confrontations in 1987 and 1996. Turkey does not recognize a legal continental shelf and Exclusive Economic Zone (EEZ) around the Greek islands.

== History ==
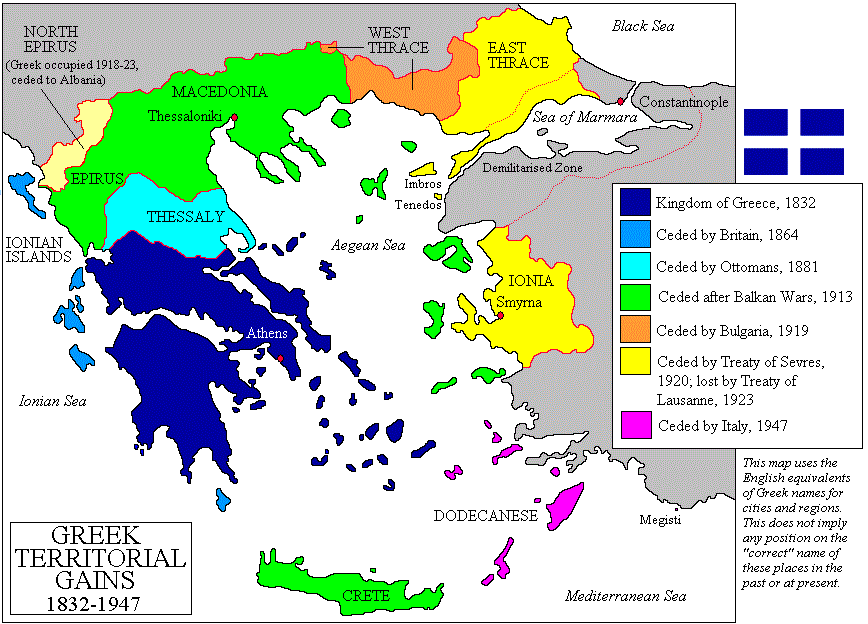
Territorial Expansion of Greece from 1832–1947

After the Greek War of Independence ended in 1829, the Greek state covered a fraction of its present territory. The first Greco-Ottoman border was the Aspropotamos–Spercheios line, followed in 1832 by the Arta–Volos line, which remained in effect until the annexation of Thessaly in 1881. The Balkan Wars of 1912–13 led to an extension of Greece northward, but at the same time, due to the advances of Serbia and Bulgaria, Greece ceased sharing a land border with the Ottoman Empire. This changed again in 1919–20, when Greece gained Western Thrace, Eastern Thrace, and the Smyrna Zone.

Following the Greco-Turkish War of 1919–1922, the present course of the border was established in 1923 by the Treaty of Lausanne, which also left the so-called "Karaağaç Triangle" (Greek: Τρίγωνο του Καραγάτς), a suburb of the city of Edirne, Turkey, as a Turkish exclave on the western side of the river. This territory was ceded during the Lausanne negotiations in exchange for Turkey abandoning its claim for war reparations on Greece.

The Greek-Turkish border, as defined by Lausanne, can be seen as a successor of the Bulgarian-Turkish border set out by the Treaty of Constantinople (1913) and Bulgarian–Ottoman convention (1915) several years earlier, but this time with Greece as party, as Bulgaria had ceded Western Thrace to Greece in the Treaty of Neuilly after World War I.

=== European migrant crisis ===
A group of Syrian refugees arrive by boat from Turkey to airport area of Mytilini, Lesvos island, Greece, 13 December 2015

Because the refugees entering Europe in 2015 were predominantly from the Middle East, the vast majority first entered the EU by crossing the Aegean Sea from Turkey to Greece by boat; Turkey's land border has been inaccessible to migrants since a border fence was constructed there in 2012. As of June 2015, 124,000 migrants had arrived into Greece, a 750 percent increase from 2014, mainly refugees stemming from the wars in Syria, Iraq, and Afghanistan. Greece appealed to the European Union for assistance, whilst the UNCHR European Director Vincent Cochetel said facilities for migrants on the Greek islands were "totally inadequate" and the islands in "total chaos". Frontex's Operation Poseidon, aimed at patrolling the Aegean Sea, is badly underfunded and undermanned, with only 11 coastal patrol vessels, one ship, two helicopters, two aircraft, and a budget of €18 million. In September 2015, the photos of dead 3-year-old Alan Kurdi, who drowned when he and his family were in a small inflatable boat which capsized shortly after leaving Bodrum trying to reach the Greek island of Kos, made headlines around the world. Konstantinos Vardakis, the top EU diplomat in Baghdad, told The New York Times that at least 250 Iraqis per day had been landing on Greek islands between mid-August and early September 2015.

After the 2016 Turkish coup d'état attempt Greek authorities on a number of Aegean islands have called for emergency measures to curtail a growing flow of refugees from Turkey, the number of migrants and refugees willing to make the journey across the Aegean has increased noticeably. At Athens, officials voiced worries that Turkish monitors overseeing the deal in Greece had been abruptly pulled out after the failed coup with little sign of them being replaced.

At the start of the 2020 Greek–Turkish border crisis in late February 2020, migrants started to gather at the Greek-Turkish land border after Turkish president Recep Tayyip Erdoğan announced that he would no longer "block" refugees and migrants' "access to the border", and opened the border with Greece. Turkey's government was also accused of pushing refugees into Europe for political and monetary gain.

During March 2020, the migrants repeatedly tried to cross the border fence but they were blocked by Greek army, police, and small detachments of policemen from Austria, Cyprus, Czech Republic, and Poland, who defended the fence and resisted the migrants using tear gas. Among those who illegally attempted to cross were individuals from Africa, Iran, Afghanistan, and Syria. Greece responded by refusing to accept asylum applications for a month. As migrants tried to breach the border fence using tools, they also set fires, threw stones, and Molotov cocktail firebombs over to the Greek side and there are videos of Turkish security forces in uniform and plain-clothes, firing tear gas at Greek forces and a Turkish armored vehicle attempting to pull down the border fence by tugging on an attached cable. Sources also verified that there is an undisclosed detention center that founded by Greek forces for expelling the migrants without any legal process.

On 2 March, Muhammad al-Arab, a Syrian asylum seeker was shot dead on Turkish soil from 15–135 metres (49–443 ft) away. According to an analysis by Forensic Architecture, the victim was shot by Greek soldiers standing at the border. On 4 March, Turkish authorities reported that the Greek border guard used live rounds and injured asylum seekers. Forensic Architecture reviewed the evidence and found that one Pakistani, Muhammad Gulzar, was killed and seven were wounded, and determined that it was "highly probable" that the live rounds came from the Greek side of the border. According to an article by Der Spiegel, it’s "quite possible" that Gulzar was shot accidentally, by a ricochet. The shooting of Gulzar has been dismissed by Greek government spokesmen, as "fake news" spread by the Turkish authorities. There is still no commonly accepted account of what happened on both incidents.

By 11 March 2020, 348 people who illegally crossed the borders had been arrested and 44,353 cases of unlawful entry had been prevented.

== Crossings ==
There are three crossings along the entire border, two for vehicular traffic and one for vehicular and rail traffic. The busiest of three, İpsala, is among the busiest border checkpoints in the world.

(Turkey) Turkish checkpoint	Province	(Greece) Greek checkpoint	Province	Opened	Route in Turkey	Route in Greece	Status
Pazarkule	Edirne	Kastanies	Evros	20 April 1952			Open
İpsala	Edirne	Kipoi	Evros	10 July 1961			Open
Uzunköprü	Edirne	Pythio	Evros	4 September 1953	Istanbul–Pythion railway		Open

== See also ==
- Greece–Turkey relations
- Population exchange between Greece and Turkey
