= Evros River incident =

1986 skirmish between Greek and Turkish soldiers

- Part of Greece-Turkey relations
Date	19 December 1986
Location	Greece–Turkey border at Evros river, near Feres
Result	Ceasefire

Belligerents
Hellenic Republic	Republic of Turkey

Strength
3 soldiers	2 soldiers

Casualties and losses
1 killed 1 wounded	2 killed

The Evros River incident of 19 December 1986 was a skirmish between Greek and Turkish soldiers along the Evros river, near the town of Feres on the Greco-Turkish border.

According to Greek reports, the incident began at 11:15 a.m, when a 3-man Hellenic Army patrol met with a Turkish Armed Forces patrol, along the Evros river border area. It is claimed that a Greek soldier, Pvt. Zissis Karagogos, met with one of the Turkish soldiers, who offered to trade cigarettes, but on setting down his rifle and helmet, was fatally shot by a Turkish soldier lying in wait, leading to both parties opening fire on each other.

According to reports from Turkish officials, the incident occurred on the Turkish side of the border and it was the Greek soldiers who first crossed the border and opened fire on a Turkish party. That being said, the Turkish officials did not clarify which Greek soldier opened fire.

The resulting action lasted more than two hours, and saw other Turkish soldiers rushing to the scene of battle. Two Turkish soldiers, Lt. Hakan Turkyilmaz and Pvt. Mehmet Kalyon, were killed, while another Greek soldier was injured.

Turkish and Greek soldiers have exchanged fire in the past, as Greek troops often have to stop refugees from entering the country illegally via the Turkish border, but this incident was the first in which there were casualties. Throughout this period, Greek soldiers along the border with Turkey were on alert, after receiving reports that Turkey planned to help thousands of refugees illegally slip into Greece.

In response to the death of one of its soldiers, the Greek Ministry of National Defence demanded an apology and compensation.

Turkish forces increased security along the border and the Cabinet met in emergency session. The Turkish Foreign Ministry summoned Greek Ambassador to protest the firing. While Greek forces in the area were put on high alert.

In the end, both sides deemed the exchange a "local one" and did not escalate the situation. Top military and civilian authorities from both countries later met to discuss a border protocol aimed at preventing future confrontations. Despite border tensions remaining high, violent clashes between Greek and Turkish soldiers have since been avoided.

== See also ==
- 1987 Aegean crisis - border dispute between Greece and Turkey the next year that almost escalated into an all-out war.
