= Panagiotis Theodorakidis =

Greek military officer

Panagiotis Theodorakidis (or Panayiotis Theodorakides, born 1958) is a Greek former military officer.

== Early life ==
He was born in Nafplion, Greece, in 1958.

He joined the Greek Military Academy in 1976.

== Career ==
After attending the principal Infantry courses, he was selected for the Hellenic Army Special Forces, where he served as a trainer and commander of Special Forces Units. In the 1987 crisis he was front line task force commander. He specialised in nuclear and chemical warfare in the US and was the first Greek Officer who participated as national representative with United Nations Forces in Western Sahara. He served as staff officer in the OPS Directorate of Hellenic Army General Staff.

He attended senior staff schools of NATO in the US and Europe, in management and control of operations, mission coordination, crisis management and international negotiations. He attended PhD courses in International Relations in European universities. He participated in several European Union seminars on security policy, arms reduction and social development. He completed many missions for which he was honored with many Greek and foreign medals.

In 1993 he was assigned to NATO where he served as spokesman during the operations of the Alliance's South Region Headquarters. He contributed decisively for the establishment of the NATO Headquarters in Greece. As Plans and Policy Staff Officer, he represented NATO Headquarters until September 2002, when he voluntarily left the Greek Army.

== Retirement ==
During the Olympic Games of 2004 in Greece, he worked for their successful conduct in the Games' Ops Department and thereafter, as Deputy Director of the Media Centre of the Olympic Stadium. On 2006 he was elected as councilor in the Prefecture of Athens – Piraeus.

In 2011 he was invited by the UN in New York as an expert. He addressed the issue “Sahel countries stabilization” at the Organization’s Permanent Committee.

== Affiliations ==
He speaks fluent English, German, Italian and French and is a member of international associations and institutes for security and development. He is an associate Member of the Hellenic Defense Agency of Strategic Analysis. He has authored studies, published articles and also participated in prime-time news bulletins, broadcasts and panel – discussions (Greece and abroad), for commenting and expressing technocratic opinion on political, geostrategic and military topicality issues.
