= United Nations Security Council Resolution 395 =

UN Security Council Resolution 395
- Territorial waters of Greece and Turkey
- Date: 25 August 1976
- Meeting no.: 1,953
- Code: S/RES/395 (Document)
- Subject: Greece-Turkey
- Voting summary: 15 voted for; None voted against; None abstained
- Result: Adopted

Security Council composition
- Permanent members: China; France; Soviet Union; United Kingdom; United States
- Non-permanent members: Benin; Guyana; Italy; Japan; Libya; Pakistan; Panama; Romania; Sweden; Tanzania

United Nations Security Council Resolution 395, adopted unanimously on August 25, 1976, after hearing various points by the foreign ministers of Greece and Turkey regarding a territorial dispute in the Aegean Sea, the Council noted the ongoing tension and called on both sides to exercise restraint and enter negotiations. It also made both countries aware that the International Court of Justice is qualified enough to be able to settle any remaining legal disputes.

Greece had accused Turkey of conducting seismological operations on the continental shelf claimed by Greece. Meanwhile, Turkey had protested against harassment and intimidation of a Turkish civilian research vessel.

== See also ==
- Aegean dispute
- Greek–Turkish relations
- List of United Nations Security Council Resolutions 301 to 400 (1971–1976)
