= Yé ké yé ké =

1987 single by Mory Kanté

Single by Mory Kanté

from the album Akwaba Beach
- Language: Mandinka
- B-side: "Akwaba Beach"
- Released: 1987
- Genre: Afro-pop; house; griot; technopop; world
- Length: 3:58
- Label: Barclay, London (UK)
- Songwriter: Mory Kanté
- Producer: Nick Patrick

Mory Kanté singles chronology
"Yé ké yé ké" (1987)	"Tama" (1988)

"Yé ké yé ké" is a song by Guinean recording artist Mory Kanté. It was written by him and released on his third album, Á Paris, in 1984. A remixed version was included in his fifth album, Akwaba Beach (1987), and released as a single. The song became an international hit; it was one of Africa's best-ever selling hits as well as being a European number one in 1988, making it the first ever African single to sell more than one million copies. The song was a top five hit in France, Switzerland, West Germany and the Netherlands, where it topped the chart for two weeks. A remix, the "Afro Acid Mix" was especially made for UK release, where it reached No. 25. In 1994, German techno duo Hardfloor remixed the song and released this new version with moderate success. A Bollywood song, "Tamma Tamma Loge", also used the music of the song.

== Background and lyrics ==
The lyrics are in Mandinka. Kanté adapted it from a traditional song called "Yekeke". "All good things have many owners," said Kanté in a 1997 interview. He added that "the song comes from a wonderful tradition we have in the villages. You know, when young griots are approaching the age of marriage, they flirt with each other through music. They court and ensnare each other through their songs and dances. These are sweet songs, I swear. 'Yekeke' is one of them. It's the sound that young women make when they dance ... It's their way of communicating their interest."

== Critical reception ==
A review in Music & Media stated that it was easy to understand why it was a hit, as it is "a festive and very rhythmic chant, with stirring vocals wrapped in an unbridled, energetic production". In 1995, Kris Needs from NME wrote, "A smattering of test pressings sparked untold mayhem over the Christmas period as Hardfloor took the ethnically-vocalled house classic from 1988 and surgically altered it into their inimitable apocalypse now. The funky acid groove grows into a relentless turbo-monster before that earth-shaking kick drum re-entry which never fails to catapult the assembled company into terminal, gibbering orbit. Techno needs more wildness and less simpering. This is wild." Brad Beatnik from the Record Mirror Dance Update gave it a full score and named it Tune of the Week. He described it as "a trance frenzy that still holds on to the wonderful — and exceedingly catchy — vocals. An acidic gurgling keyboard and an atmospheric swirling background break things down before an extended drum roll gets things banging hard again. Wonderful stuff."

== Impact and legacy ==
English DJ, producer and broadcaster Dave Pearce included "Yé ké yé ké" in his all-time top 10 in 1997, saying, "A classic that always evokes a strong reaction—a real feel-good track that works well as a transformation track when following on from someone else's set. I play it all the time." RedBull.com ranked it number six in their list of "10 Underrated Dance Songs from the 1990s That Still Sound Amazing" in 2020.

== Track listings ==
- 7-inch single
1. "Yé ké yé ké" – 3:58
2. "Akwaba Beach" – 5:11
- 12-inch maxi
1. "Yé ké yé ké" (remix) – 6:17
2. "Akwaba Beach" – 5:11
3. "Yé ké yé ké" – 3:58
- 12-inch maxi – US
1. "Yé ké yé ké" (French remix) – 6:17
2. "Yé ké yé ké" (Afro acid mix) – 5:25
3. "Yé ké yé ké" (Mory's house version) – 5:25
4. "Yé ké yé ké" (French edit) – 3:38
5. "Akwaba Beach" – 5:11
- 12-inch maxi – UK
1. "Yé ké yé ké" (the Afro acid remix) (*engineered by Robin Guthrie)
2. "Akwaba Beach"
3. "Yé ké yé ké" (the French remix)
- CD single
1. "Yé ké yé ké" (remix) – 6:20
2. "Akwaba Beach" – 5:14
3. "Yé ké yé ké" (live) – 7:17

== Charts ==
=== Weekly charts ===
Original version

Chart (1988)	Peak position
Austria (Ö3 Austria Top 40)	10
Belgium (Ultratop 50 Flanders)	1
Europe (Eurochart Hot 100)	1
Finland (Suomen virallinen lista)	1
France (SNEP)	5
Greece (IFPI)	1
Ireland (IRMA)	10
Italy Airplay (Music & Media)	1
Netherlands (Dutch Top 40)	1
Netherlands (Single Top 100)	1
Portugal (AFP)	2
Spain (AFYVE)	1
Sweden (Sverigetopplistan)	12
Switzerland (Schweizer Hitparade)	2
UK Singles (Official Charts)	29
US Dance Club Play (Billboard)	19
West Germany (GfK)	2

1995 version

Chart (1995)	Peak position
Australia (ARIA)	97
Ireland (IRMA)	17
Scotland (OCC)	20
UK Singles (Official Charts)	25
UK Dance (OCC)	1
UK Pop Tip Club Chart (Music Week)	30

Chart (2009)	Peak position
UK Dance (OCC)	40

1996 remix

Chart (1996)	Peak position
Scotland (OCC)	30
UK Singles (Official Charts)	28
UK Dance (OCC)	1

Chart (1997)	Peak position
UK Dance (OCC)	21

=== Year-end charts ===
Original version

Chart (1988)	Position
Belgium (Ultratop)	7
Europe (Eurochart Hot 100)	5
Netherlands (Dutch Top 40)	12
Netherlands (Single Top 100)	19
Switzerland (Schweizer Hitparade)	5
West Germany (Media Control)	7

1995 version

Chart (1995)	Position
UK Club Chart (Music Week)	65

== Popular culture ==
=== Asia ===
Due to the international popularity of the song, Cantopop singer Priscilla Chan recorded a cover version (地球大追蹤) on her 1988 album, Autumn Colours (秋色) . In September 1989, the song appeared in a television commercial for the second generation Toyota Carina ED in Japan.

The song was also popular in India. "Yé ké yé ké" was used as background music in the 1990 Bollywood film Agneepath, inspired the Bollywood song "Tamma Tamma" in the 1990 film Thanedaar, and inspired the song "Pellikala Vachesindhe" in the 1997 Telugu film Preminchukundam Raa.

=== Greece ===
A Greek-language parody of Yé ké yé ké, titled Ελλάδα Είναι Μόνο Μία (There is only one Greece), was recorded by Harry Klynn for his 1989 political comedy album Ραντεβού Με Την... Εισαγγελία (Date with the...Prosecutor). In contrast to Mory Kanté's original subject of doting on a love interest, Klynn's parody version discusses various political issues present in Greece during the late 1980s such as the Davos process for reconciliation between Greece and Turkey. In particular, the main chorus of the original is replaced by "It's burning, Our cunts is burning" to imply the lack of action on the part of the Papandreou government in power at the time.

=== Italy ===
In 1987 the Italian producer (and Media Records boss) Gianfranco Bortolotti released a medley under his Club House alias, with "Yé ké yé ké" being mixed up with "I'm a Man", a song originally recorded by The Spencer Davis Group and also known from the version recorded by Chicago (Chicago Transit Authority). In 1989, Club House's medley was licensed from Media in Italy to Music Man Records in the UK and became a small hit, peaking at number 69 in the British charts.
