= Yannis Kapsis =

Greek journalist and politician

Deputy Minister of Foreign Affairs of Greece
- In office 1982–1989
- Prime Minister: Andreas Papandreou

Personal details
- Born: 1929
- Died: 13 November 2017 (age 87–88) Athens, Greece

Yannis Kapsis (1929 – 13 November 2017) was a Greek journalist and politician who was deputy foreign minister from 1982 to 1989, under Prime Minister Andreas Papandreou.

From 1974 to 1982, he was editor of Ta Nea, then Greece's highest-circulation newspaper.

During his term of office, he was part of the miscommunication between Greece and Turkey that caused the 1987 Aegean Crisis.

He was the father of prominent journalists Pantelis and Manolis Kapsis.

He died in Athens on 13 November 2017.
