= Kipoi, Evros =

Kipi Κήποι
- Settlement
- Location within Greece
- Coordinates: 40°57′12″N 26°18′24″E
- Country: Greece
- Administrative region: Eastern Macedonia and Thrace
- Regional unit: Evros
- Municipality: Alexandroupolis
- Time zone: UTC+2 (EET)
  - Summer (DST): UTC+3 (EEST)

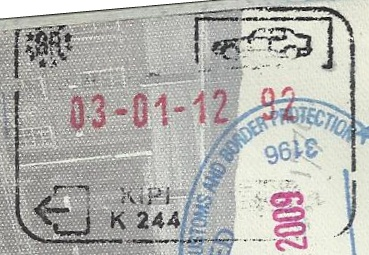
Passport stamp from the border crossing with Turkey

Kipoi or Kipi (Greek: Κήποι) is a village in Feres municipal unit, Evros regional unit in northeastern Greece. A major motorway border crossing between Greece and Turkey is located here. The town on the Turkish side is İpsala. Kipoi was known as "Bahçeköy" ("Garden Village") or "Alibeyçiftliği" ("Ali Bey's Farm") during Ottoman rule. The settlements was created with the migration of Arvanites from Turkey in 1923. They largely originate from the inhabitants of the villages of Qytezë and Sultanköy.

Kipoi is located on the right bank of the river Evros which forms the border between Greece and Turkey.

The Kipoi border crossing is the eastern starting/ending point of European route E90 which is also the A2 motorway (Egnatia Odos). The motorway connects to Turkish Highway D110.
