= Greece–Turkey relations =

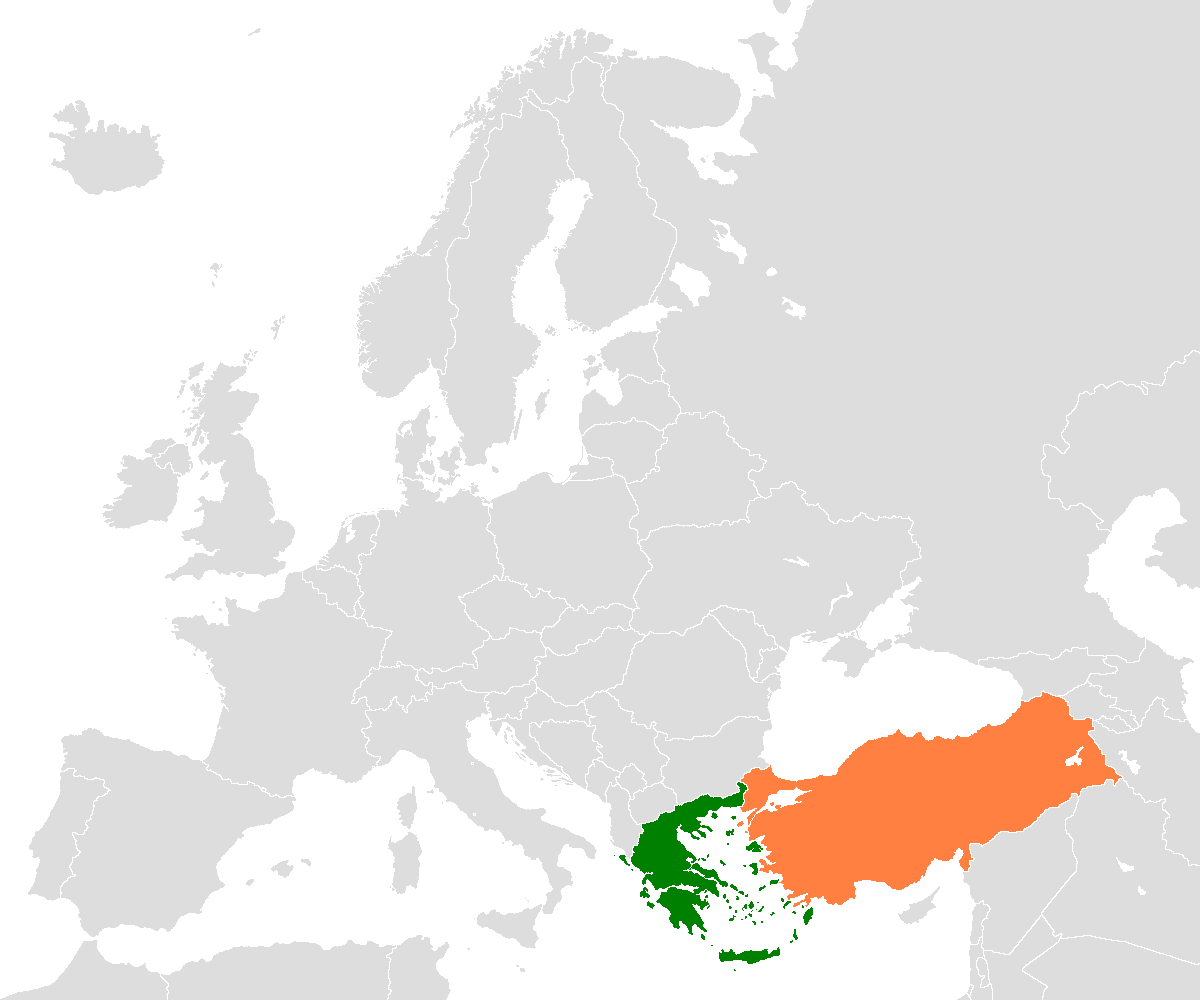
- Greece: Turkey

Diplomatic mission
- Embassy of Greece, Ankara: Embassy of Turkey, Athens

Greece and Turkey established diplomatic relations in the 1830s following Greece's formation after its declaration of independence from the Ottoman Empire. Modern relations began when Turkey was proclaimed a republic in 1923 following the defeat of the Ottoman Empire in World War I. Rivalry has characterised their relations for most of their history with periods of positive relations but no underlying resolution of the main issues.

Control of the eastern Mediterranean and Aegean seas remains the main issue affecting bilateral relations between the two countries. Following the aftermath of World War II, the UNCLOS treaty, the decolonisation of Cyprus, and the addition of Dodecanese to Greece's territory have strained the relationship. Several issues frequently affect their current relations, including territorial disputes over the sea and air, minority rights, and Turkey's relationship with the European Union (EU) and its member states—especially Cyprus. Control of energy pipelines is also an increasing focus in their relations.

== Contextual overview on relations ==
The histories of the Byzantine Empire and Ottoman Empire factor into modern relations between Turkey and Greece. There is a debate that Turkey is not a successor state but the legal continuation of the Ottoman Empire as a republic.

Greece and Turkey have a rivalry with a history of events that have been used to justify their nationalism. These events include the Greek genocide, the Istanbul pogrom and the illegal occupation of Cyprus condemned under UN Resolution 550. Greek-Turkish feuding was not a significant factor in international relations from 1930 to 1955, and during the Cold War, domestic and bipolar politics limited competitive behaviour against each other. By the mid-1990s and later decades, these restraints on their rivalry were removed, and both nations had become each other's biggest security risk.

== Diplomatic missions ==
The first official diplomatic contact between Greece and the Ottoman Empire occurred in 1830. Consular relations between the two countries were established in 1834. In 1853, a Greek embassy was opened in Istanbul; this was discontinued during periods of crisis and eventually transferred to the new capital Ankara in 1923 when the Republic of Turkey was formed.

Turkey's missions in Greece include its embassy in Athens and consulates general in Thessaloniki, Komotini and Rhodes. Greece's missions in Turkey include its embassy in Ankara, and consulates general in Istanbul, İzmir and Edirne.

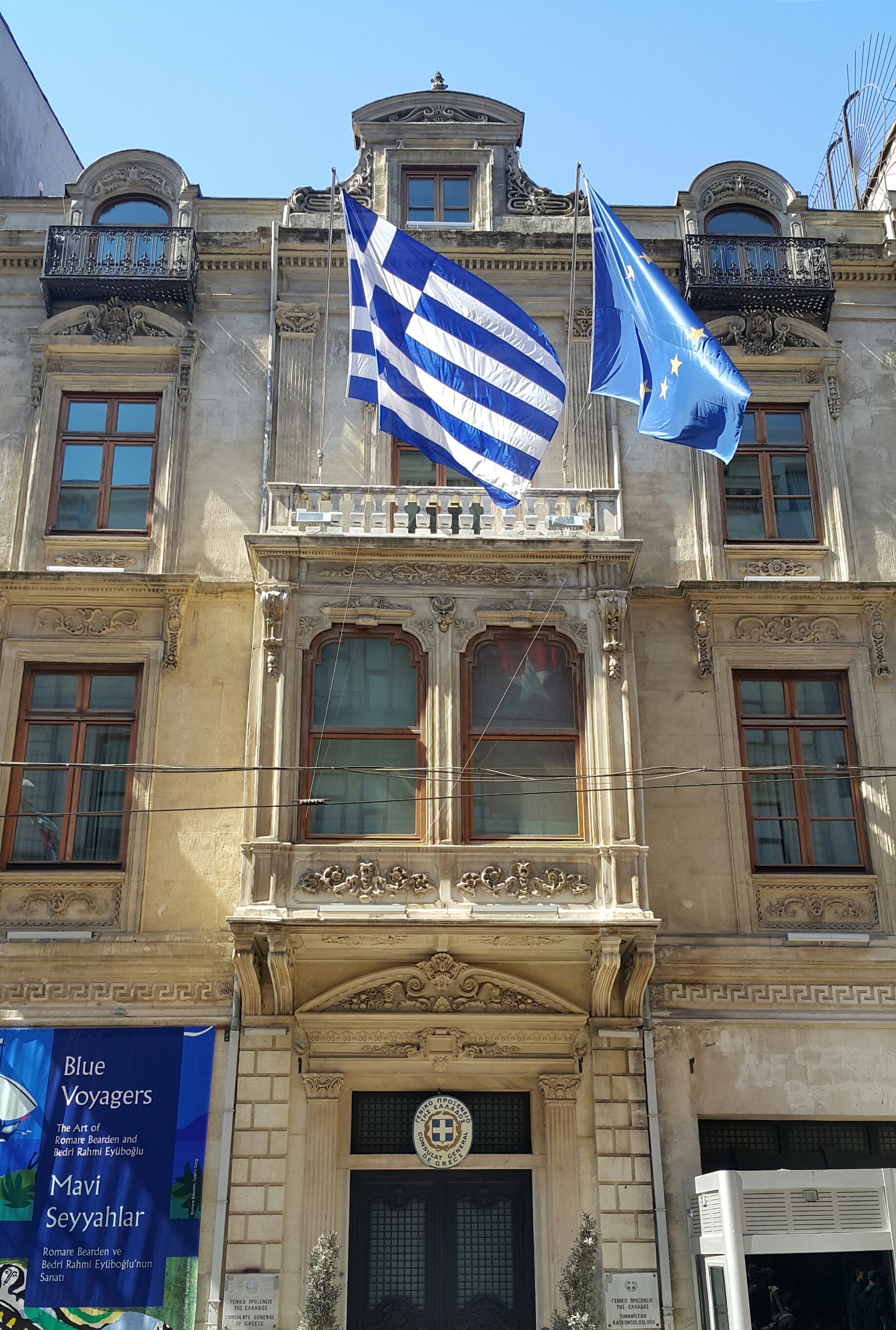
Consulate general of Greece in Istanbul

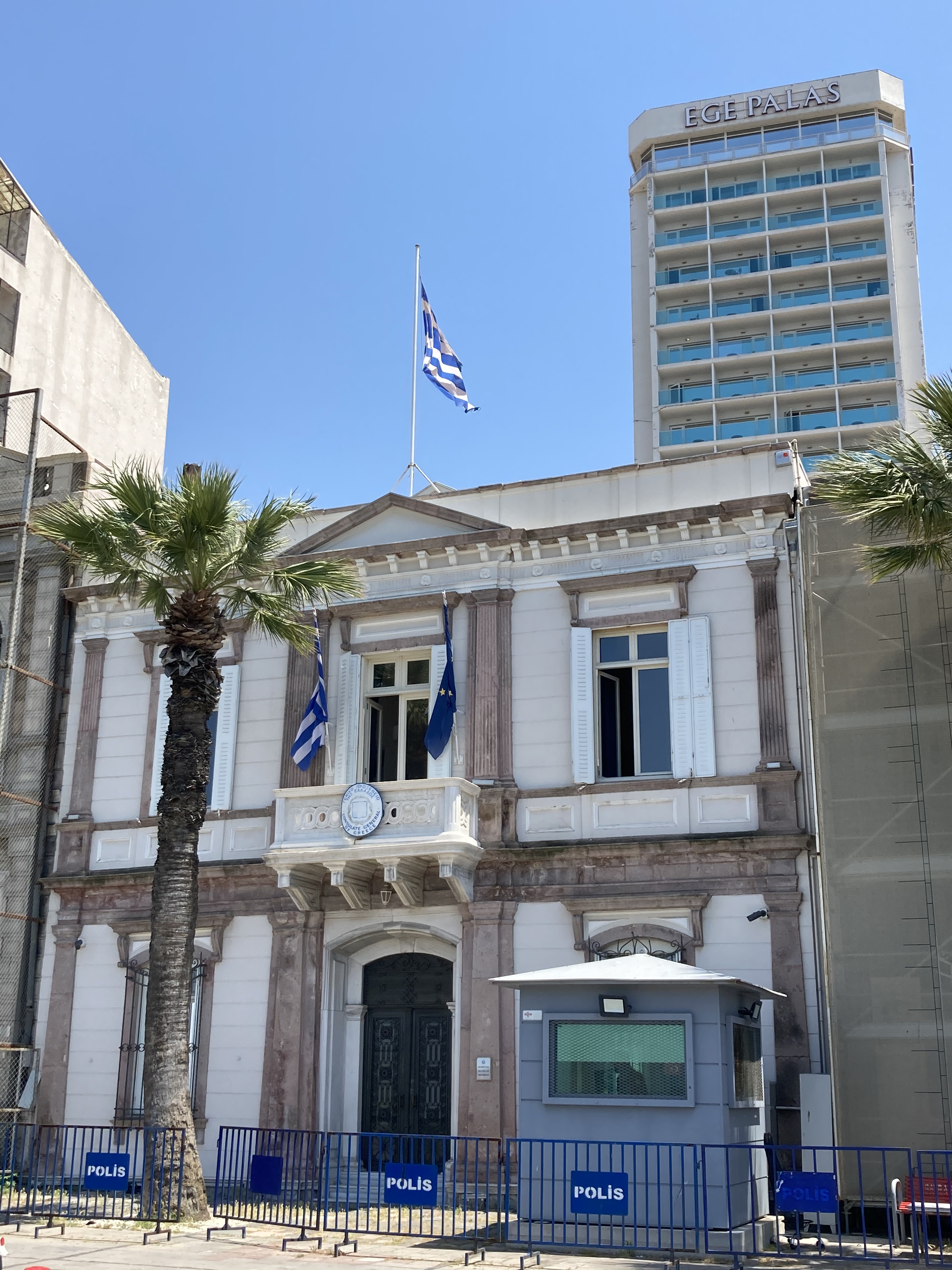
Consulate general of Greece in Izmir

== History ==
=== Background ===
The Greek presence in Asia Minor (Anatolia) dates to the Late Bronze Age (1450 BC) or earlier. The Göktürks of the First Turkic Khaganate was the first Turkic state to politically use the name Türk. The first contact with the Byzantine Empire is believed to have occurred in AD 563. In the 10th century, the Seljuk Turks rose to power.

The first conflict between the Byzantine Empire and Seljuk Turks occurred at the Battle of Kapetron in 1048. More notable is the Battle of Manzikert in 1071 and the Turkish settlement of Anatolia that followed. Later, Turkish Anatolian beyliks were established in former Byzantine lands and in the territory of the fragmenting Seljuk Sultanate. One of those beyliks was the Ottoman dynasty, which became the Ottoman Empire. In 1453, the Ottoman Empire conquered Constantinople, the capital city of the Byzantine Empire.

Much of modern Greece and Turkey came under Ottoman rule in the 15th century. During the following centuries, there were sporadic but unsuccessful Greek uprisings against Ottoman rule. Greek nationalism started to appear in the 18th century. In March 1821, the Greek War of Independence began.

=== Greece and the Ottoman Empire relations: 1822–1923 ===
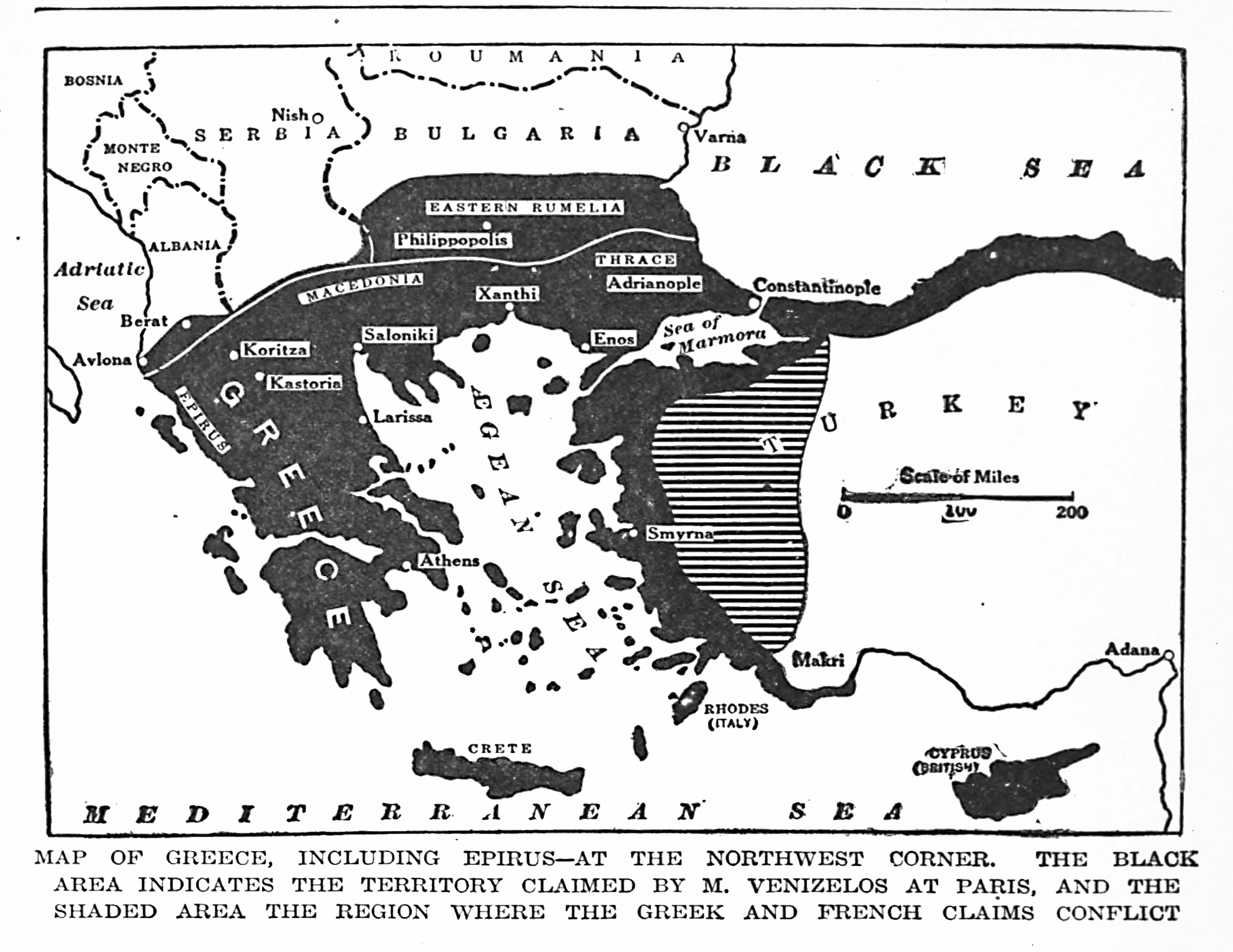
The black area indicates the territory claimed by Venizelos, a proponent of the Megali Idea, at the Paris Peace conference after World War I in 1919. The shaded region is where Greek and French claims conflict.

Following the Greek War of Independence, Greece was formed as an independent state in 1830. Relations between Greece and the Ottoman Empire were shaped by the Eastern Question and the Megali Idea. Conflicts between the two countries include the Epirus Revolt of 1854 during the Crimean War, the 1878 Greek Macedonian rebellion and the Epirus Revolt of 1878 during the Russo-Turkish War (1877–1878). Wars between the Ottomans and the Greeks include the Greco-Turkish War (1897) and the two Balkan Wars. By the end of the Second Balkan War due to the Treaty of Bucharest (1913) Greece grew by two-thirds; it went from 64,790 to 108,610 km^{2} (25,020 to 41,930 sq mi) and its population from 2,660,000 to 4,363,000. With the Allies' victory in World War I, Greece was awarded sovereignty over Western Thrace in the Treaty of Neuilly-sur-Seine; and Eastern Thrace and the Smyrna area in the Treaty of Sèvres. Greek gains were largely undone by the subsequent Greco-Turkish War (1919–1922).

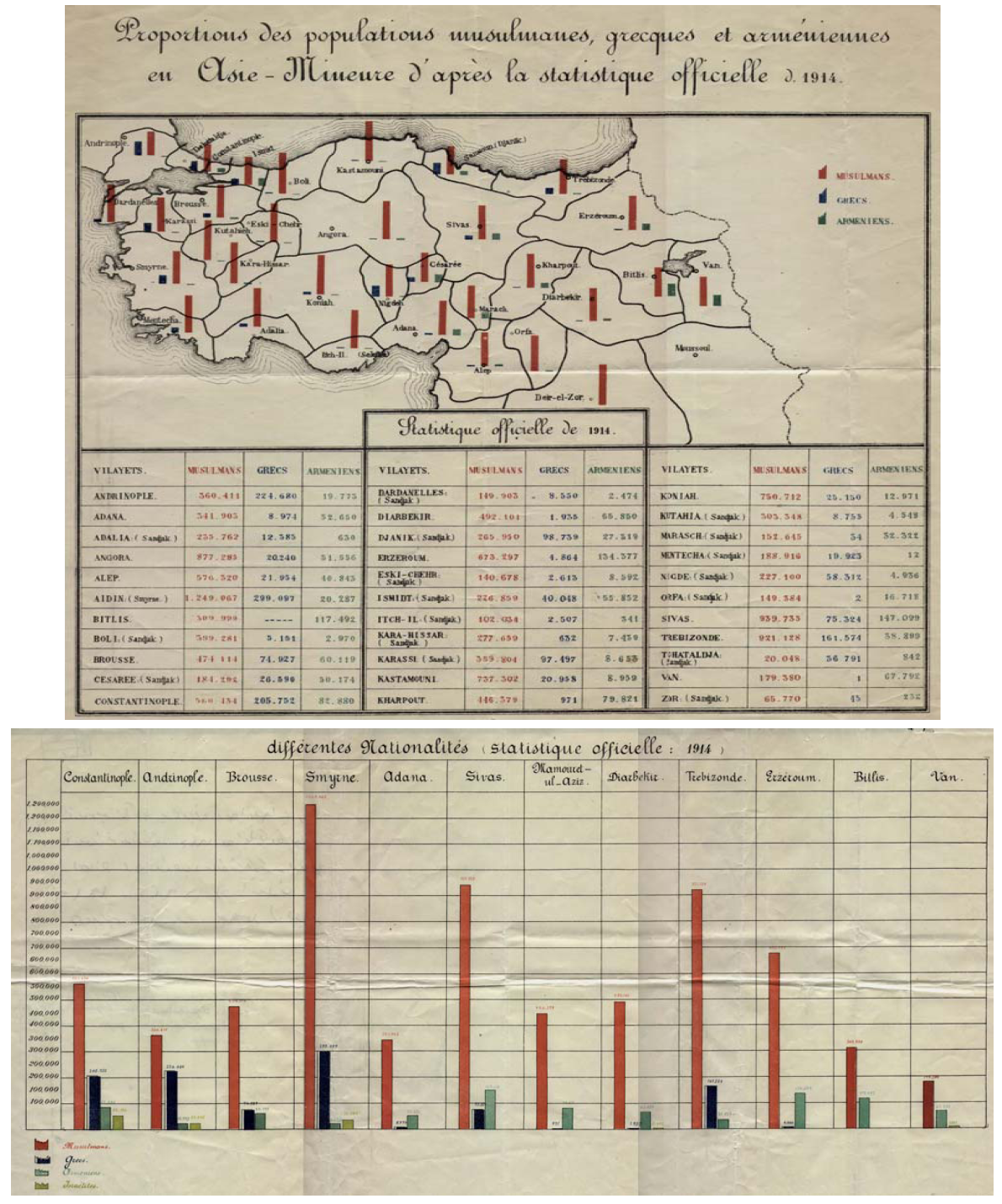
Population of Greeks in Asia Minor after the Balkan Wars

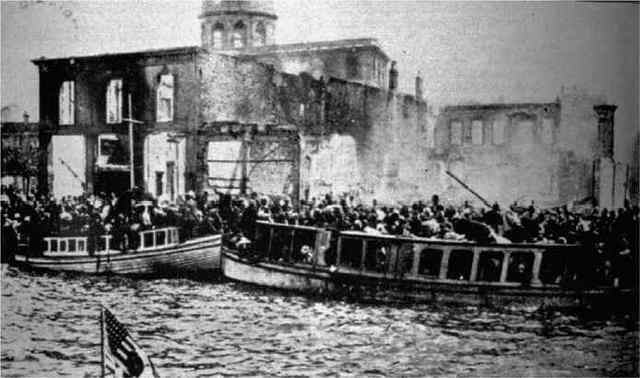
Overcrowded boats with refugees fleeing the Great fire of Smyrna. The photo was taken from the launch boat of a US warship.

Greece occupied Smyrna on 15 May 1919, while Mustafa Kemal Pasha (later Atatürk), who was to become the leader of the Turkish opposition to the Treaty of Sèvres, landed in Samsun on 19 May 1919, an action that is regarded as the beginning of the Turkish War of Independence. Mustafa Kemal united the protesting voices in Anatolia and began a nationalist movement to repel the Allied armies that had occupied the Ottoman Empire and establish new borders for a sovereign Turkish nation. The Turkish nation would be Western in civilisation and would elevate Turkish culture that had faded under Arab culture; this included disassociating Islam from Arab culture and restricted it to the private sphere.

The Turkish Parliament in Ankara formally abolished the Sultanate and the Treaty of Lausanne (1923) ended all conflict and replaced previous treaties to constitute modern Turkey. The treaty provided for a population exchange between Greece and Turkey.

The treaty also contained a declaration of amnesty for the perpetrators of crimes that were committed between 1914 and 1922, a period which was marked by many atrocities. The Greek genocide was the systematic killing of the Christian–Ottoman Greek population of Anatolia which started before World War I, and continued during the war and its aftermath (1914–1922).

=== Initial relations between Greece and Turkey: 1923–1945 ===
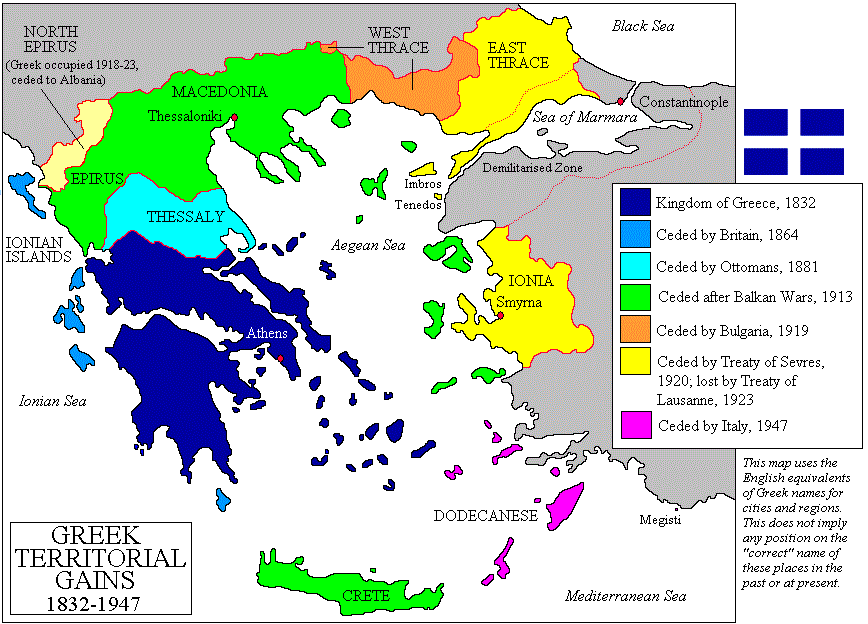
Territorial Expansion of Greece from 1832 to 1947

Following the population exchange, Greece wanted to end hostilities but negotiations stalled because of the issue of valuations of the properties of the exchanged populations. Driven by Eleftherios Venizelos in co-operation with Mustafa Kemal Atatürk, as well as İsmet İnönü's government, a series of treaties between Greece and Turkey were signed in 1930, in effect restoring Greek-Turkish relations and establishing a de facto alliance between the two countries. As part of these treaties, Greece and Turkey agreed the Treaty of Lausanne would be the final settlement of their respective borders, pledged they would not join opposing military or economic alliances, and to immediately stop their naval arms race.

The Balkan Pact of 1934 was signed, in which Greece and Turkey joined Yugoslavia and Romania in a treaty of mutual assistance, and settled outstanding issues. Venizelos nominated Atatürk for the Nobel Peace Prize in 1934.

Greece was a signatory to a 1936 agreement that gives Turkey control over the Bosporus and Dardanelles Straits, and regulates the transit of naval warships. The nations signed the 1938 Salonika Agreement which abandoned the demilitarised zones along the Turkish border with Greece that were a result of the Treaty of Lausanne.

In 1941, due to Turkey's neutrality during the Second World War, Britain lifted the blockade and allowed shipments of grain from Turkey to relieve the great famine in Athens during the Axis occupation. Using the vessel SS Kurtuluş, foodstuffs were collected by a nationwide campaign of Kızılay, the Turkish Red Crescent, and the operation was funded by the American Greek War Relief Association and the Hellenic Union of Constantinopolitans.

During this period, the Greek minority that remained in Turkey faced discriminatory targeting. In 1941 in anticipation of the Second World War, in the Twenty Classes, adult male Armenians, Greeks and Jews were conscripted into labour battalions. In 1942, Turkey imposed the Varlık Vergisi, a special tax that heavily impacted the non-Muslim minorities of Turkey. Officially, the tax was devised to fill the state treasury that would have been needed if Germany or the Soviet Union invaded the country. The tax's main purpose, however, was to nationalise the Turkish economy by reducing minority populations' influence and control over the country's trade, finance, and industries.

=== Post–World War II relations: 1945–1982 ===
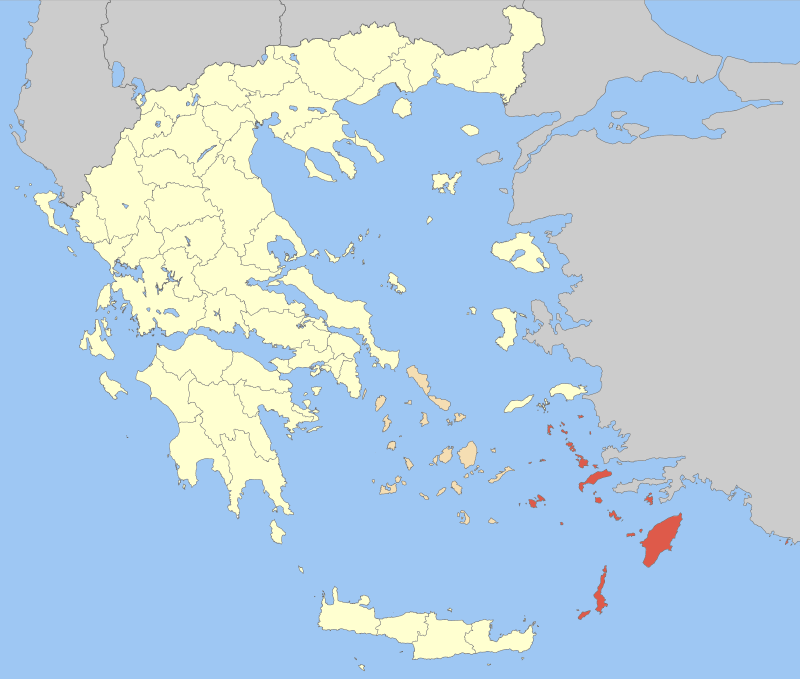
The Dodecanese islands

Following the power vacuum left by the ending of the Axis occupation after the war, the Greek Civil War erupted as one of the first conflicts of the Cold War. It represented the first example of Cold War involvement on the part of the Allies in the internal affairs of a non-Allied country. Turkey was a focus for the Soviet Union due to foreign control of the straits; it was a central reason for the outbreak of the Cold War In 1950, both Greece and Turkey fought in the Korean War, ending Turkey's diplomatic isolation and brought it an invitation to join the North Atlantic Treaty Organization (NATO); in 1952, both countries joined NATO; and in 1953, Greece, Turkey and Yugoslavia formed a new Balkan Pact for mutual defence against the Soviet Union.

Ethnic map of Cyprus in 1973. Gold denotes Greek Cypriots, purple denotes Turkish Cypriot enclaves and red denotes British bases.

According to think tank Geopolitical Futures, three events contributed to the deterioration of post-1945 bilateral relations:

1. After the defeat of Italy in the Second World War, the long-standing issue of sovereignty over the Dodecanese archipelago, which had been a sore point since the Venizelos–Tittoni agreement between Greece and Italy, was resolved to Greece's favour in 1946, upsetting Turkey because it changed the balance of power. Turkey renounced claims to the Dodecanese in the Treaty of Lausanne but future administrations wanted them for security reasons, and possibly due to the Cyprus issue.
2. After the decolonisation of Cyprus, conflict between Greeks and Turks broke out on the island. In the 1950s, the pursuit of enosis became a part of Greece's national policy. Taksim became the slogan by some Turkish Cypriots in reaction to enosis. Tensions between Greece and Turkey increased, and the ambivalence towards Cyprus by the Greek government of George Papandreou led to the Greek military coup. In 1974, the Greek government staged a coup against the Cypriot president and Archbishop Makarios by invading Cyprus and establishing a Greece-controlled Cyprus government. Soon after, Turkey—using its guarantor status arising from the trilateral accords of the 1959–1960 Zürich and London Agreement—invaded Cyprus. The Turkish Federated State of Cyprus was declared one year later.
3. Starting in 1958 and expanded in 1982 for the issue of territorial waters, the U.N. Convention on the Law of the Sea (UNCLOS) replaced the older concept of freedom of the seas, which dated from the 17th century. According to this concept, national rights were limited to a specified belt of water extending from a nation's coastlines, usually 3 nautical miles (5.6 km; 3.5 mi)—known as the three-mile limit. By 1967, only 30 nations still used the old three-nautical-mile convention. It was ratified by Greece in 1972 but Turkey has not ratified it, asking for a bilateral solution since 1974 which uses the mid-line of the Aegean instead.

6 nautical miles (nmi): Current territorial waters recognised by Greece and Turkey, and airspace as recognised by Turkey

In 1955, the Adnan Menderes government is believed to have orchestrated the Istanbul pogrom, which targeted the city's substantial Greek ethnic minority and other minorities. In September 1955, a bomb exploded close to the Turkish consulate in Greece's second-largest city Thessaloniki, also damaging the Atatürk Museum, site of Atatürk's birthplace, breaking some windows but causing little other damage. In retaliation, in Istanbul, thousands of shops, houses, churches and graves belonging to members of the ethnic Greek minority were destroyed within a few hours, over 12 people were killed and many more injured. The ongoing struggle between Turkey and Greece over control of Cyprus, and Cypriot intercommunal violence, were concurrent with the pogrom. Pressure over the resulting London Conference to discuss Cyprus, and to direct attention away from the domestic political problems were the likely motivation of the Turkish Menderes government.

In 1964, Turkish prime minister İsmet İnönü renounced the Greco-Turkish Treaty of Friendship of 1930 and took actions against the Greek minority. An estimated 50,000 Greeks were expelled. A 1971 Turkish law nationalised religious high schools and closed the Halki seminary on Istanbul's Heybeli Island, an issue that affects 21st-century relations.

== Contemporary history and issues ==
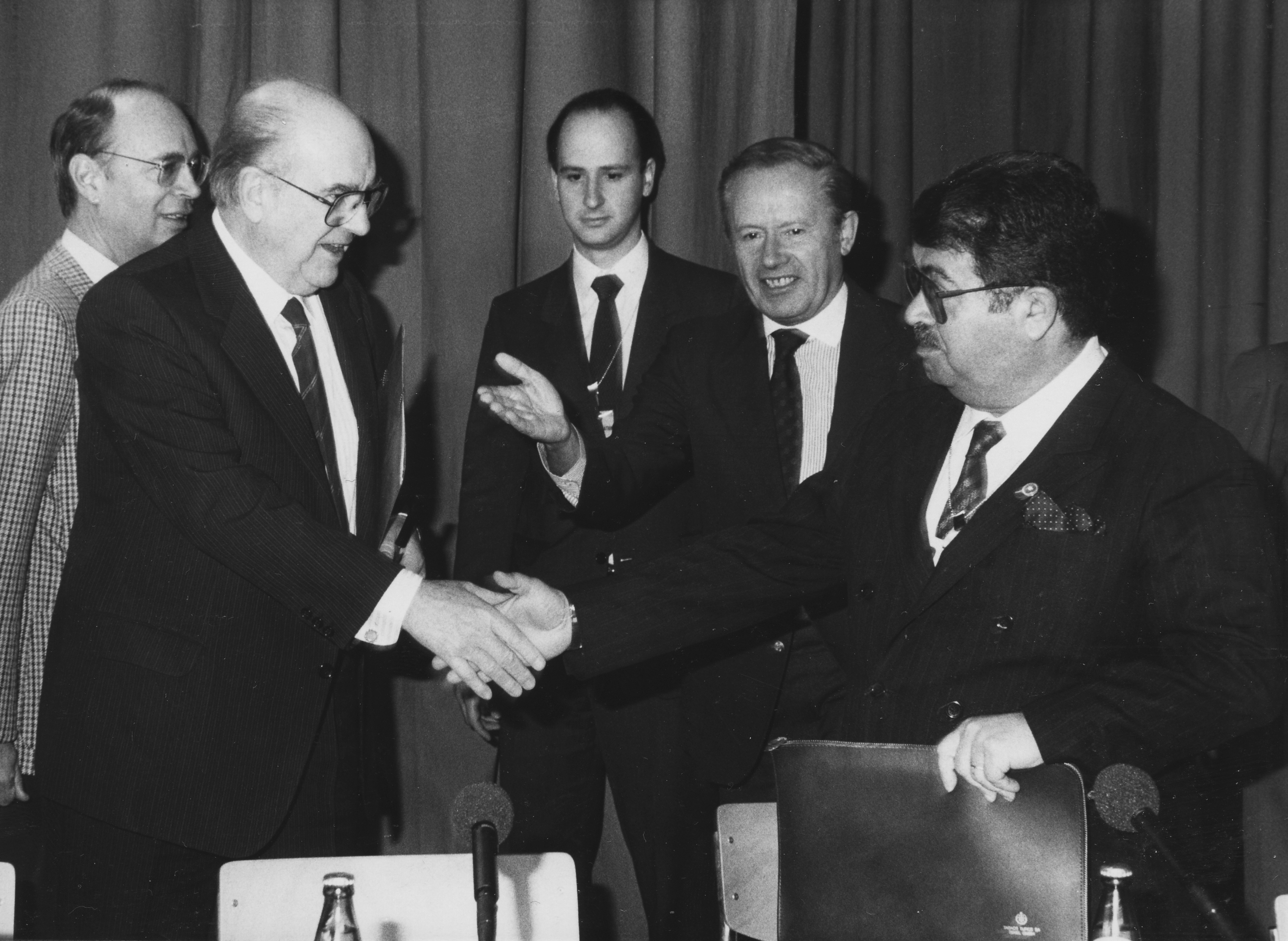
Greek Prime Minister Andreas Papandreou meeting with Turkish Prime Minister Turgut Özal in Davos, February 1986

=== Military and diplomatic tensions ===
Towards the end of the 20th century, there were several high-profile incidents between the countries. In 1976, the first crisis of Aegean Dispute brought Greece and Turkey to the brink of armed conflict over competing territorial claims and offshore exploration in the Aegean Sea. In 1986 by the border at the Evros River, a Greek soldier was shot dead. In 1987, the Turkish survey ship Sismik 1 nearly triggered a war. In 1995, a military crisis erupted over an uninhabited island called Imia, over which both countries claim sovereignty.

Lesser incidents where both side exchange fire often occur. This creates volatility when relations are tense and the risk of starting war.

In the 1990s, Duygu Bazoglu Sezer claims Greece pursued a policy of encircling Turkey. Following the breakup of Yugoslavia, both Greece and Turkey viewed each other with suspicion as they developed relations with the new countries. In 1995, however, this fear materialised. Greece formed a defence co-operation agreement with Syria, and between 1995 and 1998 established good relations with Turkey's other neighbours Iran and Armenia. In reaction, Turkey spoke with Israel in 1996, which caused uproar in Arab countries.

Dr. R. Craig Nation of the United States Army War College views the conflict between the nations as a fight for control over the Aegean Sea and the eastern Mediterranean.

=== Positive relations ===
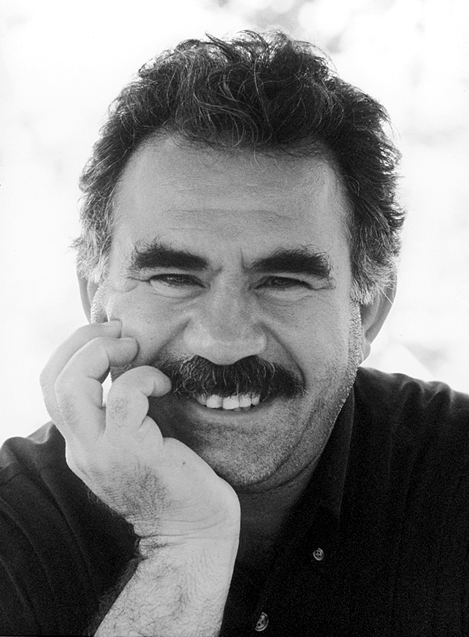
Abdullah Öcalan, founder of the PKK, designated a terrorist organisation and banned in the US, UK, EU and Turkey

In 1995, relations began to change with the Greek election of Kostas Simitis who redefined priorities but it wasn't until the meeting of the foreign ministers the following years that this was noticed. In 1998, the capture of the Kurdish separatist Abdullah Öcalan – on the way from the Greek embassy in Kenya – and the related fallout led to the Greek foreign minister resigning, whose replacement was with a strong supporter for discussions with Turkey. The 1999 İzmit earthquake followed by the 1999 Athens earthquake led to an outpouring of goodwill and what has been called earthquake diplomacy that aided in a change of relations.

In the years that followed, relations improved. They included agreements on fighting organised crime, reducing military spending, preventing illegal immigration, and clearing land mines on the border. Additionally, Greece lifted its opposition to Turkey's accession to the European Union (EU). Dr R. Craig Nation states there was a lot of progress but ultimately not on the issues that mattered.

A 2022 poll shows that 68% of Greeks view Turkish people as their friends while only 19% perceive them as enemies and 64% of Turks view Greeks as their friends and the positivity is increasing on both sides despite occasional tensions.

In December 2023, a new attempt was made at peaceful relations. Dialogue has opened, with the signing of a declaration on good neighbourly relations. Pundits remain unconvinced it means anything, at least until the Cyprus issue is addressed. Despite this, efforts continue to create goodwill, such as Turkey supporting the return of the Elgin Marbles to Greece.

=== The Aegean and Eastern Mediterranean conflicts ===
The conflict between Turkey and Greece is largely over whether the Greek islands are allowed an exclusive economic zone, the basis of claiming rights over the sea. Some claim fear of sovereignty loss is what is driving this conflict. Under Recep Tayyip Erdoğan, the Blue Homeland policy of Turkey has emerged. Islands and islets Iying within three miles (4.8 km) of the coast were included as part of the respective state under the Treaty of Lausanne. Greece controversially extended this limit to six miles (9.7 km) in 1936, which Turkey did not dispute due to good relations and reciprocated in 1964. The conference for the UN sea treaty UNCLOS defined territorial waters in 1982 and came into force in 1994.

There are 168 nations as signatories of the treaty, including Greece but not Turkey. Turkey disputes Greece can claim 12 miles off the coast of its islands, which the sea treaty permits, implying only the mainland has this right, otherwise it would give Greece dominant control of the Aegean. Turkey has made a claim for the economic zone by splitting the Aegean Sea in the middle. The EU requires membership of the sea treaty as a condition.

There has been an extension of the conflict with other nations in the Mediterranean. In 2019 and 2022, Turkey made deals with Libya to extend its economic rights over the sea, which were countered with Greece and Egypt.

The Cyprus dispute created a subsequent military build up. The dispute escalated with Greece's coup in Cyprus, which led to the Turkish invasion of Cyprus. In 1974, Greece reacted with the militarisation of the Greek islands off the coast of Turkey, the legality of which is challenged by Turkey. In 1975, Turkey created Izmir army base. Military buildups in 2022 have continued.

In August 2025, Greece announced its plans to deploy "self‑sufficient" military units on its Aegean islands. Some of these islands are located 1.5 km to the Turkish mainland. These units are planned to operate independently, generating their own food and energy and functioning without direct central command or resupply, as part of Greece's broader "Agenda 2030" defence modernization strategy. On March 12 it was reported that Turkey was unsatisfied with Greece's actions in the Aegean islands. National Defense Ministry of Turkey said that Greece is violating international treaties and undermine bilateral relations.

=== Cyprus and the EU ===
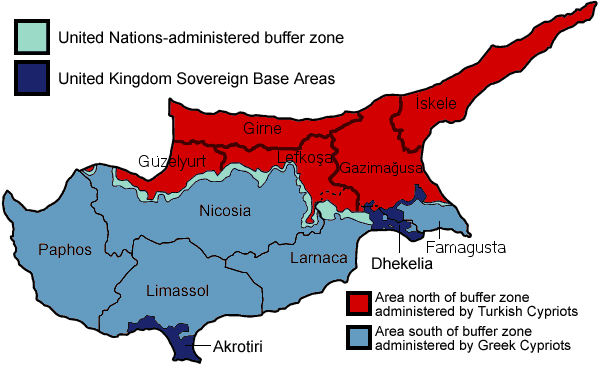
The self-declared Turkish Republic of Northern Cyprus has been recognised only by Turkey since its establishment in 1983.

Greece has been a member of the EU since 1981. Cyprus joined in 2004. Turkey submitted its application to join in 1987 and became a candidate in 1999. Accession negotiations were started in 2005, but have been stalled since 2016.

Greece since its admission had made a concentrated effort to oppose Turkey's admission to the EU and was scapegoated for resentment when it happened. This is despite its change of policy post 1995 and that was advocated during the Papandreou government. Concerns about Turkey's developmental and demographic imbalances as well as human rights and its war with Abdullah Öcalan's Kurdish Workers Party (PKK) were factors in the EU decision but in Turkey it was felt due to the "Christians’ Club" of the EU. In Turkey, this contributed to the shift away from Turkey's founding secular doctrine Kemalism and the rise of political Islam. There was a change to the Kemalism amnesia of the Ottoman Empire's past, which instead became a source of pride and identity for Turkey. Kemalism evolved to an alternative identity of European orientation as Turkey became a regional centre in the emerging Eurasian political formation.

In the 1990s, friction around Turkey's EU accession involving Cyprus was paralleled by military tensions between Turkey and Greece. In 1994, Greece and Cyprus agreed on a security doctrine that would mean any Turkish military action in Cyprus would cause war with Greece. In 1997, Cyprus purchased two Soviet-era S-300 missile systems, resulting in a political standoff between Cyprus and Turkey. Negotiations on the division on the island in the 1990s failed because of the Turkish side's recognition of North Cyprus as an independent state, an issue that remains as of 2022. When Cyprus joined the EU in 2004, the possibility of a veto by Cyprus contributed to other issues involving Turkey.

Turkey's migrant crisis has also had a big effect on its relationship with the EU. The enforcement of the arms embargo against Libya Operation Irini brought other EU members into conflict with Turkey. Gas drilling on territory disputed with Greece using research vessel RV MTA Oruç Reis led to EU sanctions against Turkey.

=== Energy pipelines ===
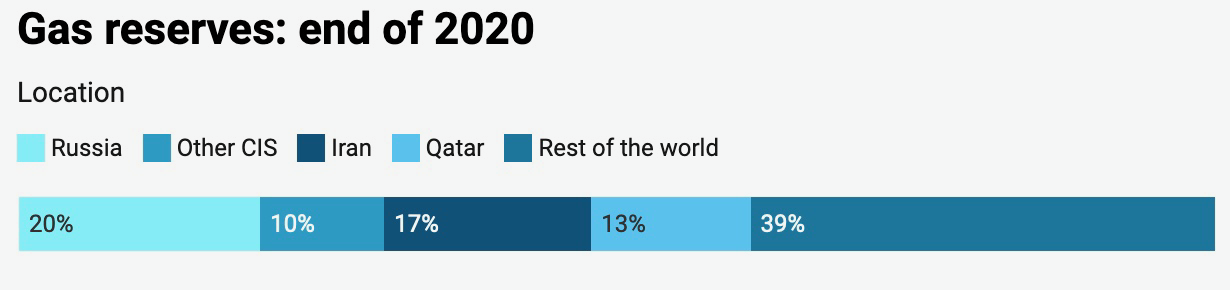
61% of the world's proven gas reserves come from three predominant nations (Russia, Iran, Qatar) and the CIS nations that surround the Caspian Sea.

The 2010 discovery of natural gas deposits in the eastern Mediterranean, first by Israel and then Egypt, has increased tensions between Greece and Turkey. The region is estimated to contain 5% of the world's known natural gas reserves. Historical security issues of the Aegean and Cyprus are important for resolving Europe's energy needs. The 2016 Turkey–Israel reconciliation led to Greece sabotaging the 2017 Cyprus–UN talks to reunify the island, preventing Israel and Turkey from developing a gas pipeline. In 2019, the east Mediterranean gas forum was created, including seven countries but excluding Turkey.

The region is considered the end-point for east–west pipelines. In 2007, the countries inaugurated the Greek-Turkish natural gas pipeline, giving gas from the Caspian Sea its first direct Western outlet. The Caspian Sea is one of the oldest oil-producing regions; it is estimated to have reserves of 48 billion barrels, and 292 trillion cubic feet of natural gas. The opening of these fields followed more than 20 years of negotiation following the 2018 convention on the legal status of the Caspian Sea. Outside of the Caspian Sea nations, there are other suppliers that wish to leverage the geographical positioning of the nations. In May 2022, Greece signed a deal with Turkey's rival the United Arab Emirates for the distribution of the UAE's liquefied natural gas.

=== Minority rights ===
The treaty of Lausanne provided for the protection of the Greek Orthodox Christian minority in Turkey and the Muslim minority in Greece. The Greek minority in Turkey has shrunk from over 200,000 in 1923 to only 2,000 in 2023, while the Turkish minority in Greece has remained steady at 120,000 in the same period.

Minorities in both countries since have been affected by the state of relations between them. Minorities are used as leverage, using the principle of reciprocity. In the 1960s, Turkey pressured the Greek minority in Turkey when the Cyprus issue escalated. Turkey used the election of Muftis by the Muslim Turkish minority in Greece as a condition for opening Halki Seminary which was closed in 1971. As a reaction in 1972, Greece closed a Turkish school in Rhodes. In recent years, Turkey has used its cultural heritage, such as Sumela Monastery, to achieve political ends.

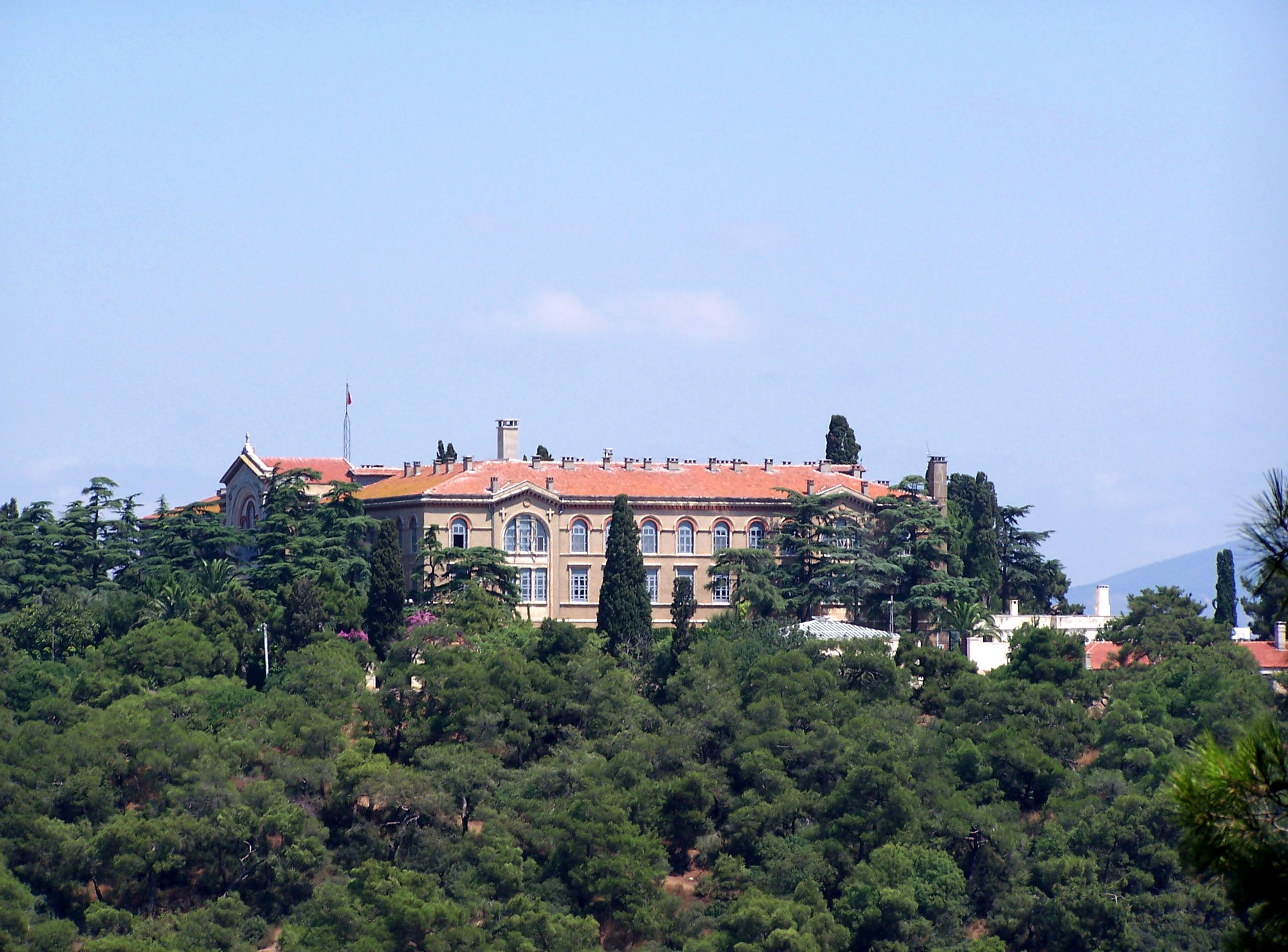
The Theological School of Halki at the top of the Hill of Hope.

Examples of minority mistreatment include:

- During World War II, Turkey nationalised its industry and imposed the Varlık Vergisi, a discriminatory wealth tax that targeted religious minorities.
- Turkey blamed Greeks for Turkey's economic problems, resulting in the Istanbul pogrom.
- The Twenty Classes
- In 1967, the Greek military government deported Turkish citizens on the Dodecanese peninsula.
- In 1955, Greece's Article 19 of the Nationality Code established two classes of Greek citizens; those of "non-Greek descent" lost their citizenship if they left the country. By the time of its abolition in 1998, 60,000 people had lost their citizenship and the abolition had no retroactive effect.

The election of Muftis in Greece and the reopening of the Halki Seminary in Turkey have become the most prominent issues. Issues around political authority and pre-conditions contribute to the stalemate. Former Greek prime minister George Papandreou has said Turkey and Greece would benefit if they treated minorities as citizens rather than foreigners.

=== Migrants ===
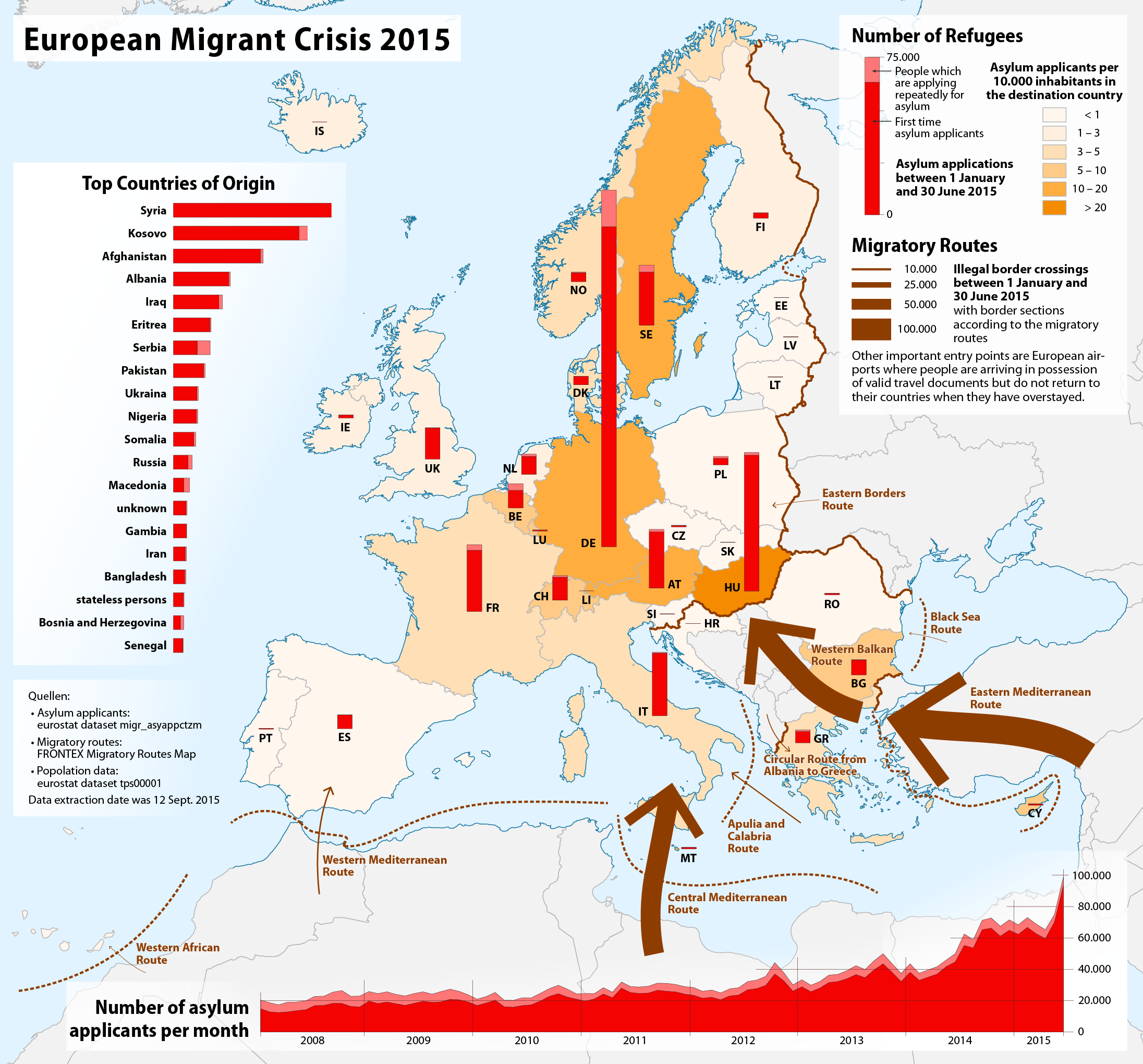
Basis for the EU-Turkey Joint Action Plan; Syrian asylum applications highest among all nationalities between 1 January and 30 June 2015

Turkey has become a transit country for people entering Europe. In 2015, the route that passes from Turkey to Greece and then through the Balkan countries became the most-used route for migrants escaping conflicts in the Middle East and North Africa, with irregular migration from further East continuing. Turkey assumed the role of guardian of the Schengen Area, protecting it from irregular migration. This, combined with Turkey's migrant crisis, has resulted in illegal migration being a key issue between Turkey and the EU. People moving across the border of Greece and Turkey are a frequent cause of incidents between the two countries.

In 2016, the EU and Turkey reached a deal on the migrant crisis. There was some success with the four-year agreement extended to 2022, but several incidents have occurred. In 2019, the Greek government warned a new migrant crisis similar to the previous one would occur.

=== Turkish insurgents and asylum seekers ===
During the 2010 trial of those accused of organising a 2003 alleged military coup attempt in Turkey called Sledgehammer, the conspirators were accused of planning attacks on mosques, triggering a conflict with Greece by Turkey shooting down one of its own warplanes and then accusing Greeks of this and planting bombs in Istanbul to initiate a military takeover.

Greece has on many occasions arrested members of the DHKP-C who planned attacks in Turkey. Turkey has accused Greece of supporting terrorists such as the DHKP-C.

Turkey has seen a slide to authoritarianism resulting in Turkish refugees becoming more common. One example includes when Leyla Birlik accused of insulting the president. This has increased since the failed 2016 Turkish coup d'état attempt, after which 995 people, including military personnel, applied for asylum. More than 1,800 Turkish citizens requested asylum in Greece in 2017, including those who plotted the assassination. Sometimes, this causes tensions between the nations in other areas.

== Timeline ==
Year	Date	Event
1923	30 January	Turkey and Greece sign the Convention Concerning the Exchange of Greek and Turkish Populations agreement
1923	24 July	Treaty of Lausanne is signed. It would come into force 6 August 1924.
1926	26 June	Mahalli Idareler Kanunu (the local government act; no. 1151/1927), concerning the local administration of Imbros and Tenedos islands was published, which stripped the islands of their local governance. This was seen as revoking article 14 of the Treaty of Lausanne; it is argued the provisions were never observed.
1933	14 September	Greece and Turkey sign a Pact of Cordial Friendship.
1934	9 February	Greece and Turkey, as well as Romania and Yugoslavia, sign the Balkan Pact, a mutual defence treaty.
1938	27 April	Greece and Turkey sign the Additional Treaty to the Treaty of Friendship, Neutrality, Conciliation and Arbitration of 30 October 1930, and the Pact of Cordial Friendship of 14 September 1933.
1941	6 October	SS Kurtuluş starts the first of five voyages, carrying humanitarian aid to Greece to alleviate the Great Famine during the Axis occupation of Greece.
1942	11 November	Turkey nationalises its industry and enacts Varlık Vergisi, a discriminatory tax targeted at non-Muslims minorities, including the Greek minority.
1947	31 March	British authorities hand over the Dodecanese islands to Greece following the Treaty of Peace with Italy.
1950		Greece and Turkey both fight in the Korean War on the side of the UN forces.
1952	18 February	Greece and Turkey officially become members of NATO.
1953	28 February	The Balkan Pact between Greece, Turkey and Yugoslavia is enacted.
1955	6–7 September	The Istanbul pogrom, in which the Greek population of Istanbul were targeted, occurs.
1963	21 December	Bloody Christmas (1963)
1964		Turkish prime minister İsmet İnönü renounces the Greco-Turkish Treaty of Friendship of 1930 and took actions against the Greek minority.
1971		Halki Theological College, the higher education component of Halki seminary and the only school where the Greek minority in Turkey educated its clergymen, is closed by Turkish authorities. All private, religious or academic, Muslim and non Muslim, are closed that year.
1971–74		Oil is discovered in the north Aegean near the Greek island Thasos. It is the first major discovery since exploration started in the mid-1960s.
1974	15 July	The Greek Junta sponsors the 1974 Cypriot coup d'état
1974	20 July – 18 August	Turkey invades Cyprus.
1976	23 July – 11 November	1976 Aegean Crisis
1987	27–30 March	1987 Aegean Crisis
1994	7 March	The Greek government declares May 19 as a day of remembrance of the (1914–1923) Genocide of Pontic Greeks.
1995	21 July	Greece ratifies the 1982 UN Convention on the Law of the Sea Turkey says the exercise of this treaty, if Greece expands its territorial waters to 12 nm, would be casus belli.
1995	26 December	Imia-Kardak crisis
1997	5 January	Cyprus Missile Crisis
1999		Abdullah Öcalan (Kurdish rebel leader), leaving the Greek embassy, is captured in Kenya and causes a crisis
2001	14 September	The Greek government declares September 14 as a day of remembrance of the Genocide of the Hellenes of Asia Minor by the Turkish state.

== See also ==
- History of Greece
- History of Turkey
- History of Cyprus
- Hellenoturkism
- Foreign relations of Greece, Turkey, Cyprus and Northern Cyprus
- Turkey–European Union relations
- Conflicts of Turkey
- Intermediate Region
- Greeks in Turkey
- Greeks in the Middle East
- Turks in Greece
- Turks in Europe
- Twice A Stranger: How Mass Expulsion Forged Modern Greece and Turkey
