= Alexis Heraclides =

Greek political scientist

Alexis Heraclides (born 1952 in Alexandria, Egypt) is a Greek political scientist and public intellectual, professor emeritus of international relations at the Panteion University of Social and Political Sciences. He is the son of ambassador Dimitris Heraclides and dentist Zina Ficardou. He taught at Panteion University from 1993 onward, from 2004 until 2019 as professor of international relations and conflict resolution.

He has been counselor on minorities and human rights in the Greek Foreign Ministry (1983-1997) and was also appointed as Greek Alternate Expert of the UN Sub-Commission on Prevention of Discrimination and Protection of Minorities in the United Nations Commission on Human Rights (1990-1992).

== Biography ==
Heraclides studied political science and International Relations at the Panteion School of Political Sciences, as it was then called, at the University of London (M.Sc. at University College, under John W. Burton) and at the University of Kent (PhD under A.J.R. Groom). His publications cover intervention in secessionist conflicts, secession and self-determination, ethnicity and nationalism, the Commission on Security and Cooperation in Europe, perceptions in foreign policy and specific conflicts mainly from a conflict resolution perspective, such as Kosovo, Southern Sudan, the Kurdish question, the Israeli–Palestinian conflict, the Cyprus problem and the Greek–Turkish conflict. His more recent publications are on humanitarian intervention in the nineteenth century, just war theory, the Macedonian question, human rights and the problem of cultural relativism, liberal Islam and human rights, and the history of Greek–Albanian relations.

== Political activity ==
Heraclides has written hundreds of articles in Greek dailies and magazines (many of which have been republished in Greek Cypriot and Turkish newspapers) on minority issues, the resolution of the Cyprus problem (via a loose consociational bicommunal federation), the amelioration of Greek-Turkish relations and the comprehensive settlement of the pending Aegean dispute, the settlement of the vexing "Macedonian Question" between Athens and Skopje, and on Greek and Greek-Cypriot nationalism. On these issues he has also participated within various NGOs in Greece and Cyprus ("The Front for Reason Against Nationalism", "Centre of Minority Groups", "Cyprus Academic Dialogue" and others).

In 1997 he was awarded the Abdi Ipekçi Peace and Friendship Prize for his newspaper articles on the resolution of the Greek-Turkish conflict. His repeated criticism of nationalism in Greece and in the Republic of Cyprus has earned him the opprobrium of key nationalist figures in both countries, and he has been repeatedly attacked in the conservative Greek and Cypriot press and by ultra-nationalist political parties (inter alia in the Greek Parliament) and organizations in Greece and Cyprus from mid-1990s until today (e.g. Greek Helsinki Monitor, press release, 2 May 2009, To Proto Thema (Greek Sunday newspaper) 29 March 2009, 5 April 2009, 12 April 2009, and Eleftherotypia (Greek newspaper) 25 April 2009. The attacks are also referred to in Radikal (Turkish newspaper) 30 March 2009 and 28 June 2009).

=== Views ===
As counselor on human rights and minorities, he was preoccupied with the Muslim/Turkish minority in Western Thrace and was instrumental in persuading the Greek side to abandon its discrimination towards the minority in question.

In 2004 he strongly supported a "Yes" vote to the Annan Plan, for the resolution of the Cyprus dispute, in which Turkish Cypriots voted "Yes" by majority and Greek Cypriots voted "No" by an overwhelming majority. He has blamed the Greek Cypriot side and especially the Cypriot president Nikos Anastasiadis for the non-resolution of the Cyprus problem in 2017.

Regarding the Macedonian dispute, Heraclides said in 2019 that the Prespa agreement was "good" for Greece, but less so for North Macedonia

In 2022, Heraclides gave an interview to the Turkish state-run Anadolu Agency, in which he said regarding the Aegean dispute that Greece should recognize the "rights" and "interests of Turkey in the Aegean Sea. This statement drew criticism from some Greek media, in which he was denounced as a propagandist for Turkish interests. In his books and articles on Greek-Turkish relations and in interviews he has argued again and again that Turkey is not "aggressive" towards Greece. He has also claimed that the Turkish casus belli against Greece, which was declared in 1995 by the Turkish parliament that unilateral action over territorial waters by Greece would constitute a reason for war may be a threat of violence but need not be taken literally.

Heraclides has also argued that the mass killings and expulsions of Greeks in 1922, committed by the Kemalist government, was not a genocide and instead ethnic cleansing. For example, he said that the Burning of Smyrna wasn't an act of genocide because "it had been preceded (and caused) by a regular war between the Greek army and Kemal's nationalist forces." Historian Erik Sjöberg explicitly criticized these assertions, stating that "Heraclides' core argument was problematic, resting as it did in a somewhat misguided assumption of war and genocide as mutually excluding." In 2006, he wrote an article regarding Armenian genocide denial in France, in which he defended it on the grounds of freedom of expression, and stated that its criminalization was "ahistorical" and was pushed by the "Armenian lobby of France" in order to stop the accession of Turkey to the European Union. Nevertheless, he accepted the Armenian genocide as a fact.

== Books ==
He has written eleven books in English and twenty in Greek, including:

- The Self-Determination of Minorities in International Politics (London: Frank Cass, 1991).
- The Arab-Israeli Conflict: The Problèmatique of Peaceful Resolution (Athens: Papazissis, 1991) [in Greek].
- Security and Co-operation in Europe: The Human Dimension, 1972-1992 (London: Frank Cass, 1993).
- Helsinki-II and its Aftermath: The Making of the CSCE into an International Organization (London: Pinter, 1993).
- Greece and the "Threat from the East" (Athens: Polis, 2001) [in Greek], also published in Turkey as Yunanistan ve "Dogu'dan Gelen Tehlike" Turkiye: *Turk-Yunan Iliskilerinde Cikmazlar ve Cozum Yollari (Istanbul: Iletişim, 2002).
- International Society and the Theories of International Relations: A Critical Survey (Athens: I. Sideris, 2000) [in Greek].
- The Cyprus Question: Conflict and Resolution (Athens: I. Sideris, 2002) [in Greek].
- The Cyprus Problem, 1947-2004: From Union to Partition? (Athens: I. Sideris, 2006) [in Greek].
- Irreconcilable Νeighbors: Greece-Turkey. The Aegean Dispute (Athens: I. Sideris, 2007) [in Greek].
- The Greek-Turkish Conflict in the Aegean: Imagined Enemies (Basingstoke: Palgrave-Macmillan, 2010). For favorable reviews of this book see Tozun Bahcheli, in South-East European and Black Sea Studies, 11:2 (2011), pp. 211–13; and Tozun Bahcheli, in Turkish Studies, 13:2 (2012), pp. 269–71.
- The Evolution of International Society (Athens: I. Sideris, 2012) [in Greek].
- with Ada Dialla, Humanitarian Intervention in the Long Nineteenth Century: Setting the Precedent (Manchester: Manchester University Press, 2015).
- National Issues and Ethnocentrism: A Critique of Greek Foreign Policy (Athens: I. Sideris, 2018) [in Greek].
- The Macedonian Question 1878-1918: From National Claims to Conflicting National Identities (Athens: Themelio, 2018) [in Greek].
- editor with Gizem Alioğlu Çakmak, Greece and Turkey in Conflict and Cooperation: From Europeanization to De-Europenalization (Abingdon: Routledge, 2019).
- Just War and Humanitarian Intervention: A History in the International Ethics of War (Athens: I.Sideris, 2020).
- The Macedonian Question and the Macedonians: A History (Abingdon: Routledge, 2021). For a favorable review of this book see Athina Skoulariki, in Historein, 21:1 (2023).
- with Ylli Kromidha, Greek-Albanian Entanglements since the Nineteenth Century: A History (Abingdon: Routledge, 2023).
- Conflict Resolution: Self-Determination, Secession, Intervention, Ethnonational and International Conflict (with a Preface by James Mayall) (Thessaloniki: Epikentro, 2024).
- Greece and its Neighbours: National identity and Otherness (Athens: I. Sideris, 2024) [in Greek].
- Islam and Islamic Thought: Philosophy, Modernism, Liberalism and their Enemies. In Quest of Averroes (Athens: Themelio, 2024)[in Greek].
- The Dark Side of the Enlightment: Race Theories and Racism (Athens: Asini, 2024) [in Greek].
- Nationalism, National Identity and Conflict in Southeast Europe: Towards a Comparative Approach (London: Transnational Press London, 2025).

== Contributions ==
His main political contributions to date are with regard to intervention in secessionist conflicts, the reasons for separatism, secession and self-determination, human rights norm-setting in the CSCE process, the Cyprus problem, the Greek-Turkish conflict in the Aegean and the history of humanitarian intervention. In particular his 2010 book on the Aegean Dispute was highly acclaimed, as well as his 2021 book on the Macedonian Question and the Macedonians (see e.g. A. Skoulariki, review in Historein 2023). His 1993 book Security and Co-operation in Europe: The Human Dimension, 1972-1992 (London: Frank Cass, 1993) was well received (see book reviews: K. Larres in International Affairs, 70:2 (1994), pp. 317–18; A. Bloed in Helsinki Monitor: Quarterly on Security and Cooperation in Europe, 5:4 (1994), pp. 103–4; E. Decaux, in Politique Etrangere, 58 (Winter 1993-1994), pp. 1076–77).
