= 1976 Aegean Crisis =

Geo-Political dispute between Greece and Turkey

- Part of Aegean Dispute
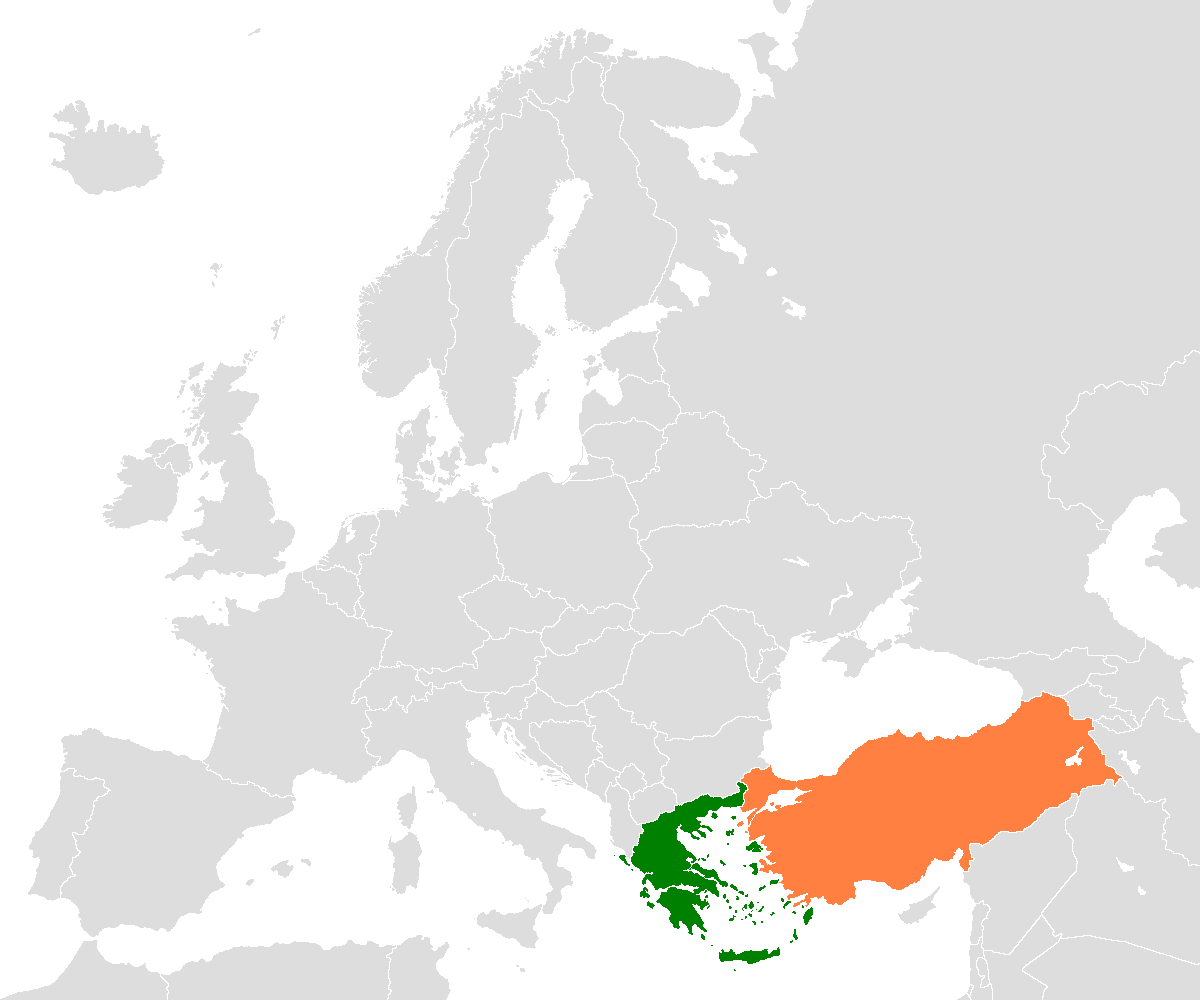
- Map of Europe highlighting Greece and Turkey
Date	23 July – 11 November 1976
Location	Aegean Sea
Result	Signed the Bern Protocol, refraining from oil exploration in the Aegean Sea

Parties involved in crisis
Greece	Turkey

Commanders and leaders
Konstantinos Karamanlis	Süleyman Demirel

The Aegean crisis of 1976 (Greek: Κρίση στο Αιγαίο, romanized: Krísi sto Aigaío, Turkish: Ege kıta sahanlığı krizi) was a confrontation between Greece and Turkey over sovereignty, maritime boundaries, and resource rights in the Aegean Sea.

Driven by energy shortages during the 1973 oil crisis, Turkey turned its attention to offshore oil exploration in the Aegean Sea. This exploration became part of a broader territorial disagreement between Greece and Turkey known as the Aegean Dispute. At the time, negotiations over the United Nations Convention on the Law of the Sea were underway, and a Greek extension of its territorial waters from six to twelve miles was possible. Turkey opposed such an extension because it would limit its access to the high seas and its availability for oil exploration, and it declared that such an extension by Greece would constitute a casus belli (cause for war). Tensions between the two countries increased and became more complicated after the Turkish invasion of Cyprus of 1974. Efforts by the Greek prime minister Konstantinos Karamanlis led to a temporary agreement with his counterpart Süleyman Demirel to pursue negotiations regarding the Aegean dispute and possible adjudication before the International Court of Justice. However, political opposition in Turkey, led by Bülent Ecevit, forced Demirel to break the agreement and adopt a more assertive stance after Turkey's success in Cyprus.

In spring and summer 1976, Turkey deployed the research vessel RV MTA Sismik 1 several times into the Aegean Sea to conduct seismic studies near and in regions claimed by Greece, escalating tensions. Both countries conducted military exercises and placed their military forces on high alert. The Greek government appealed to the United Nations Security Council and the International Court of Justice.

NATO and US officials increasingly became worried about a potential war between two NATO countries, both of whom were necessary to prevent the Soviet Union from accessing the high seas. Diplomatic efforts by US Secretary of State Henry Kissinger mitigated tensions between Greece and Turkey, resulting in the United Nations Security Council Resolution 395 on 25 August 1976. Later that year, Greece and Turkey signed the Protocol of Bern, agreeing to halt oil exploration in the Aegean Sea and to continue negotiating the continental shelf dispute.

== Background ==
Territorial waters based on (left) 6 nmi and (right) 12 nmi. The former corresponds to the territorial waters during the 1987 crisis, while the latter corresponds to the extent of territorial waters and national airspace defined as a legal right by UNCLOS, to which Greece is a signatory, and Turkey is not.

The sharp rise in oil prices during the 1973 oil crisis created acute supply pressures in Turkey and increased interest in exploring the Aegean for hydrocarbons. At the same time, exaggerated claims by Greece's military government in 1973 that significant oil reserves had been discovered near Thasos and Lemnos led Turkish policymakers to believe that Greece was attempting to monopolize Aegean oil resources. On 1 November 1973, Turkey granted the Turkish State Petroleum Company (TAPC) exploration rights in areas which Greece had already licensed to foreign companies. On the same day, a map was published ignoring the Greek islands in its depiction of the continental shelf, marking the first highlight of the Aegean Dispute. In February 1974, the Greek government protested, while the Turkish government responded by proposing bilateral negotiations.

The Aegean Dispute was further complicated by the ongoing negotiations that had started in 1973 for the United Nations Convention on the Law of the Sea (UNCLOS). One of the emerging provisions was the right of states to extend their territorial waters from six to twelve miles (Note: In this article, "miles" refers to nautical miles.) from their coastlines, including around inhabited islands. According to Turkish officials, such an extension would place much of the Aegean Sea under Greek sovereignty and jurisdiction and restrict Turkey's access to the high seas, effectively described as turning the Aegean Sea into a "Greek lake". As a result, beginning in 1974, Turkey declared that a Greek extension to twelve miles would constitute a casus belli (cause for war).

On 26 January 1974, Bülent Ecevit became the Turkish prime minister after the Ecevit–Erbakan coalition took office and announced plans for oil exploration. On 29 May, the survey ship Candarli entered the Aegean Sea escorted by 32 warships. The ships withdrew five days later. Turkey subsequently expanded its exploration claims, while threatening war if Greece extended its territorial waters to 12 miles.

The Aegean Dispute was temporarily sidelined by the Cyprus crisis in July 1974. On 15 July, Cypriot forces, backed by the Greek military government, attempted to overthrow President Makarios III, who was in favor of an independent republic of Cyprus, and replace him with Nikos Sampson, who favored a union with Greece. Five days later, Turkey launched a military invasion, invoking its position as a guarantor power under the 1960 Treaty of Guarantee. The Greek military government was unable to respond to Turkish actions and fell on 23 July 1974. With the restoration of civilian rule, former prime minister Konstantinos Karamanlis returned from exile and formed a government of national unity.

== Prelude ==
Following the 1974 November parliamentary election, Karamanlis attempted to renormalize Greek-Turkish relations. At the time, the previous Turkish coalition government had dissolved and for the following five months, Turkey had a caretaker government under Sadi Irmak with Melih Esenbel as foreign minister. Early in 1975, Karamanlis proposed to his Turkish counterpart to refer the continental shelf dispute to the International Court of Justice (ICJ). Irmak welcomed the proposal and he called a meeting of the Turkish political leaders, where all, with the exception of Ecevit, agreed to not reject the proposal. In March 1975, a new coalition government formed in Turkey, with Süleyman Demirel of the Justice Party as premier along with Necmettin Erbakan of the National Salvation Party and Alparslan Türkeş of the Nationalist Movement Party. At a NATO summit in May 1975, Karamanlis and Demirel reaffirmed the agreement and, if necessary, to refer the issue to the Hague Court.

Tensions increased when the Turkish government established the Aegean Army opposite the eastern Greek islands in July 1975. At this point, Karamanlis proposed a non-aggression pact to deescalate the ongoing arms race between Greece and Turkey. Demirel was caught off-guard, and for a period he was not forthcoming. Turkish diplomats viewed the proposal positively. However, the Turkish political opposition, particularly Ecevit, considered the proposal as a maneuver to confine Turkey in the potential outcome of Greece extending its territorial waters to 12 miles. Demirel rejected the proposal in a letter to Karamanlis. Increasingly, U.S. intelligence viewed the Aegean dispute as more dangerous than the crisis in Cyprus. In the meantime, political opposition in both countries to the agreement intensified. Andreas Papandreou, who was a rising opposition figure in Greek politics, criticized Karamanlis for "losing the psychological war" with Turkey. In Ankara, Demirel was criticized for agreeing to go to the ICJ. Demirel retreated from the agreement with Karamanlis. One of the two deputies of the prime minister, Alparslan Türkeş, claimed that islands near the Turkish coast, including the Dodecanese, should be Turkish. Additionally, Turkey planned to resume surveys in the Aegean Sea.

== Events ==
In spring 1976, the Turkish government was considering sending the research vessel RV MTA Sismik 1 (formerly known as Hora) into the disputed Aegean continental shelf, while Greece urged a judicial settlement. It was followed by Greek and Turkish military exercises with both fleets being on high alert. United States Secretary of State Henry Kissinger urged restraint while avoiding taking sides. However, his stance disappointed the Greek officials, because Kissinger had previously conceded to Greek Foreign Minister Dimitrios Bitsios that the sailing of the RV MTA Sismik 1 constituted a provocation. Turkish officials warned that any interference with its vessels would be considered an act of piracy. In mid-July, the National Security Council decided to allow the Soviet aircraft carrier Kiev to pass through the Straits into the Mediterranean Sea. NATO officials were concerned that Soviet access to high seas might alter the balance of power in the eastern Mediterranean Sea. American officials viewed this move as an attempt by the Turkish government to create a strategic insurance in the Aegean dispute by seeking closer ties with Moscow, while, at the same time, it believed that the United States government would not risk undermining the Turkey–United States relations.

On 23 July, Turkey sent RV MTA Sismik 1 into the Aegean for its first exploratory voyage, increasing fears of a Greek–Turkish confrontation. The timing further complicated the situation. The vessel's entry into Aegean waters was four days before the European Community officially agreed to open accession negotiations with Greece. The Community's association meeting with Turkey was scheduled for 24 July, but negotiations had broken down, fueling resentment in Turkey. Public perceptions, as described by a New York Times columnist, were that Turkey's success in seizing part of Cyprus in 1974 had emboldened Ankara, while the Greeks were convinced that Turkey was seeking to seize islands off the Anatolian coast. On 4 August, RV MTA Sismik 1 returned to a Turkish port without entering disputed waters.

On 6 August, RV MTA Sismik 1 sailed again and conducted research on the Greek-claimed continental shelf; it was accompanied by a minesweeper and other naval cooperation aircraft. Greek armed forces were placed on high alert with deployments of naval and air units along the frontier and had the Turkish vessel under surveillance, while Turkey also increased its military readiness. The presence of the Turkish vessel in the Greek-claimed waters triggered a response by Papandreou, who publicly urged the Greek government to sink the Turkish vessel. At this point, U.S. officials feared that an interception by the Greek forces could trigger a war between the two NATO allies. The crisis reached its peak on 9 August, when RV MTA Sismik 1 approached the disputed area again. Greek forces moved to monitor the vessel, but they soon withdrew. Later that day, Karamanlis criticized Turkey's actions while calling for a fair settlement of their differences. The following day, the Greek government appealed simultaneously to the U.N. Security Council and the ICJ, seeking international support and interim protection.

== Diplomatic efforts ==
Concerns over another Greek–Turkish conflict led Kissinger to hold parallel talks with the Greek and Turkish foreign ministers in New York to prevent further escalation. He proposed a temporary arrangement, aiming to please both sides, in which both sides would suspend exploration and initiate bilateral negotiations, while leaving open the possibility of judicial settlement. At the time, relations between the two sides were strained, with little trust between them. As Bitsios said, "all it would take is a small incident; indeed, we depend on the sangfroid of the mere captain of some small ship somewhere." Both Greek and Turkish officials initially were reluctant to agree to Kissinger's proposal for different reasons. The Greek officials resisted treating Turkey's claims as equivalent to its own, while Turkish officials opposed a United Nations resolution and instead preferred bilateral negotiations. The negotiations frustrated Kissinger, and at one point, he said to the negotiators of both sides: "I will now go to Bitsios and see him alone. I'll come back to see you then and then I will see my psychiatrist. You guys have so complicated the Cyprus problem that no one can understand it and now you're doing it to the Aegean." Eventually, the two sides accepted a compromise and RV MTA Sismik 1 returned to the port of İzmir, where it was welcomed by a crowd, sheep sacrifices, and bands performing martial music.

On 24 August 1976, the United Nations Security Council adopted Resolution 395, calling for restraint, direct negotiations, and possible legal adjudication. The resolution reduced tensions without resolving the dispute. Greece's case before the ICJ failed to reach a settlement. In September 1976, the Court rejected Greece's request for interim measures, and in 1978, it ruled that it lacked jurisdiction because both parties had not consented to its jurisdiction. The ICJ also rejected Turkey's request to remove the case from its agenda.

On 11 November 1976, Karamanlis and Demirel signed the Protocol of Berne in Montreux, Switzerland. Under the agreement, Greek and Turkish governments pledged to hold confidential negotiations on the continental shelf issue and pause oil exploration in the Aegean Sea. However, mutual suspicion persisted and another Aegean crisis took place in 1987.

== Sources ==
Books

- Heraclides, Alexis (2010). The Greek-Turkish Conflict in the Aegean. London: Palgrave Macmillan. ISBN 978-0-230-28339-8.
- Koliopoulos, John S.; Veremis, Thanos M. [in Greek] (2009). Modern Greece A History Since 1821. Oxford: Wiley-Blackwell. ISBN 978-1-4443-1483-0.
- Katsoulas, Spyros (2021). The United States and Greek-Turkish Relations, The Guardian's Dilemma. London & New York: Taylor & Francis. ISBN 978-1-000-51433-9.
- Tsakonas, Panagiotes (2015). The incomplete breakthrough in Greek-Turkish relations: Grasping Greece's socialization strategy. London: Palgrave Macmillan UK. ISBN 978-0-230-27807-3.

Journals and reports

- Aydın, Mustafa (1997). "Cacophony in the Aegean Contemporary Turkish-Greek Relations". The Turkish Yearbook of International Relations (27): 109–140. doi:10.1501/Intrel_0000000256.
- Ayman, S. Gülden (2001). "The Kardak (Imia) Crisis αnd Turkish-Greek Relations". Etudes Helleniques/Hellenic Studies. 9 (2): 49–72. ISSN 0824-8621.
- Veremis, Thanos (1996). "Greek-Turkish Relations: Crisis in the Aegean". Études helléniques/Hellenic Studies. 4 (2): 19–32. ISSN 0824-8621.
- Wilson, Andrew (1979). Aegean Dispute. Adelphi Paper No. 155. London: The International Institute for Strategic Studies. ISBN 0-86079-030-4.
- Greece and Turkey: Aegean Issues — Background and Recent Developments (PDF). CRS Report for Congress (Report). 21 August 1997. CRS Report 97-799.
- United Nations Security Council (25 August 1976). Resolution 395 (1976) (Report). United Nations. S/12187.

Newspapers

- Sulzberger, C. L. (28 July 1976). "Oil on the Waters". The New York Times. p. 24.
