= 2020 Greek–Turkish border crisis =

Turkish opening of border for migrants

- 2020 Evros migrant crisis Part of European migrant crisis
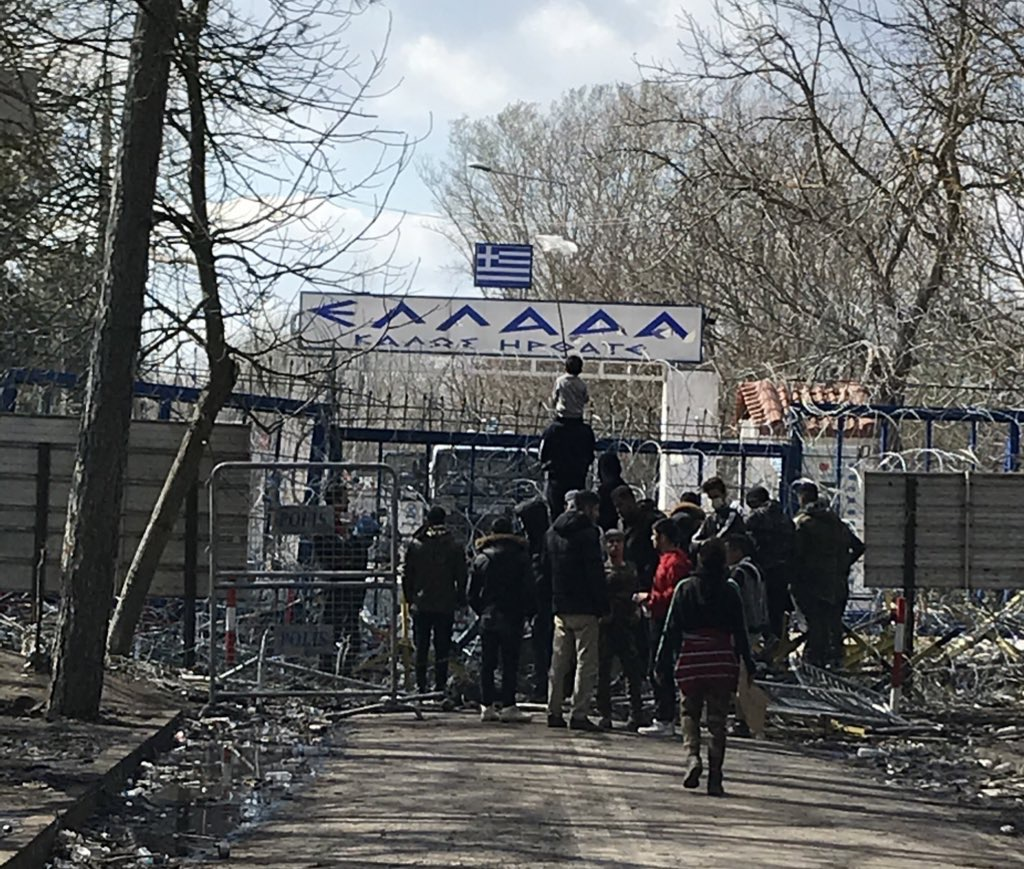
- Date: 28 February 2020 to April 2020
- Location: Greek-Turkish border (more specifically in Kastanies, Evros)
- Goals: Recep Tayyip Erdoğan's pressure on the European Union
- Methods: Thousands of migrants sent by the Turkish government to the border
- Result: Borders reopened

Parties
Hellenic Police; Hellenic Coast Guard Greek Armed Forces and local residents	Turkish Police Turkish Armed Forces and tens of thousands of migrants

Number
	20,000+ migrants

The 2020 Greek–Turkish border crisis along the Evros River began on 28 February when the government of Turkey announced that, in response to the death of 33 Turkish soldiers in Idlib, it was unilaterally opening its borders to Greece to allow refugees and migrants seeking refuge to reach the European Union.

Tens of thousands of migrants arrived at the Greek–Turkish border along the Evros River through white buses and taxis. They were aided by the Turkish Armed Forces. A Turkish armored car attempted to break the border fence with no success. The Greek police forces, with the help of the citizens, managed with fire extinguishers, tear gas, loudspeakers as well as by repairing the fence to prevent the invasion. The Greek Prime Minister Kyriakos Mitsotakis finally closed the border for security reasons.

== Timeline of events ==
=== February ===
In response to the dozens of Turkish soldiers killed in the attack by Syrian and Russian forces in the Idlib region, Turkey announced that it was unilaterally opening its borders to Europe to refugees and migrants, ordering the security forces located on the border with Greece to do not obstruct their passage. Within hours, large groups of migrants began arriving at the Greek-Turkish land border, with Turkey officially announcing the crossing of 80,000 migrants to Greece and the announcement of the two hundred thousand that follow.

The Greek Government immediately stopped the operation of the border customs of Kastanies, in order to ensure the prevention of uncontrolled entry of people into Greek territory.

On the morning of Saturday, February 29, the Turkish President Recep Tayyip Erdoğan said that Turkey's borders with Europe are open, noting: "We will not close the gates to refugees. About 18,000 refugees have already passed and today the number will be 25,000 to 30,000 and we will not close our doors, because the EU must abide by its commitments.".

Thousands of people were crowded in the area of Kastanies, seeking to cross to the Greek side, while MAT units are arriving from various areas of Greece to strengthen the Greeks deterrent force. The Minister of Civil Protection, Michalis Chrysochoidis, during his visit to Evros stated: "Thousands of unhappy people are stacked at our borders. They have not come here on their own. They are expelled, repelled and used by the neighboring country, Turkey. We want to send a message in every direction that we will not let anyone pass without legal travel documents. Greece has borders. "Europe has borders.".

=== March ===
The Greek Prime Minister, Kyriakos Mitsotakis, gave an interview to the American network CNN and to the journalist Richard Quest. Referring to the Greek-Turkish crisis, he said: "What we are facing at the moment is not essentially the immigration or refugee problem. It is a conscious attempt by Turkey to use migrants and refugees as geopolitical pawns to advance its own interests. The people trying to cross into Greece do not come from Syria, they do not come from Idlib. They lived in Turkey for a long time, most of them speak Turkish fluently. They receive the full support of the Turkish government, as it provides them with the means to transport them to the border, and of course Greece does what every sovereign state has the right to do: to protect its borders from any illegal entry. That is what we are doing and that is what we will continue to do."

On the same day, in the sea area of Lesvos, there was an incident between a boat of the Greek and Turkish coast guards, when the latter tried to provoke the other increasing the risk of collision. In his statements on the incident, the Minister of Shipping of Greece, Giannis Plakiotakis, stated that the men and women of the Coast Guard acted in accordance with International Law, while underlining Greece's determination to protect and guard its maritime borders.

The Turkish Interior Minister Süleyman Soylu, in statements, urged refugees and migrants to go to Greece via the Evros River, saying: "This is just the beginning. In some places (of Evros) the level from the rain dropped to 40 to 45 cm. What does this mean? That on foot you can easily cross. Mitsotakis does not have the ability to keep them at the border. See what happens next. It's not just what has happened so far, but also what will happen next."

In the morning, but also on the Saturday afternoon, in the area were fired fireballs and chemicals from both sides. According to information and videos broadcast by Greek media, a Turkish armored vehicle attempted to tear down part of the fence in Kastanies without success.

== International reactions ==
=== European Union ===
The President of the European Commission, Ursula von der Leyen, the President of the European Council, Charles Michel, and the President of the European Parliament, David Sassoli, arrived in the Evros region on March 3, fully supporting Greece and its efforts to stop attempts to enter illegally from Turkish territory.

Ursula von der Leyen, in a statement, stated that "Greek concerns are our concerns, the Greek borders are European borders. We declare our European solidarity with Greece. We trust your government and for the additional reason that although you have a very important project, we welcome the fact that you are operating in accordance with European law".

=== United States ===
A US State Department official said: "The United States recognizes the right of Greece to enforce its own laws on its borders. We call on both sides to show restraint, as this situation is evolving on the Greek-Turkish border".

=== Germany ===
The German government has refrained from condemning the opening of the Turkish border, while focusing on supporting the European Union-Turkey Immigration Agreement. Speaking to reporters, Chancellor Angela Merkel said she understood that Ankara expected more support from Europe to deal with the refugee crisis, but noted that the Turkish president "should not use refugees to express his displeasure".

== See also ==
- Population exchange between Greece and Turkey
