= 1987 Aegean Crisis =

Geopolitical dispute between Greece and Turkey

- Part of Aegean Dispute
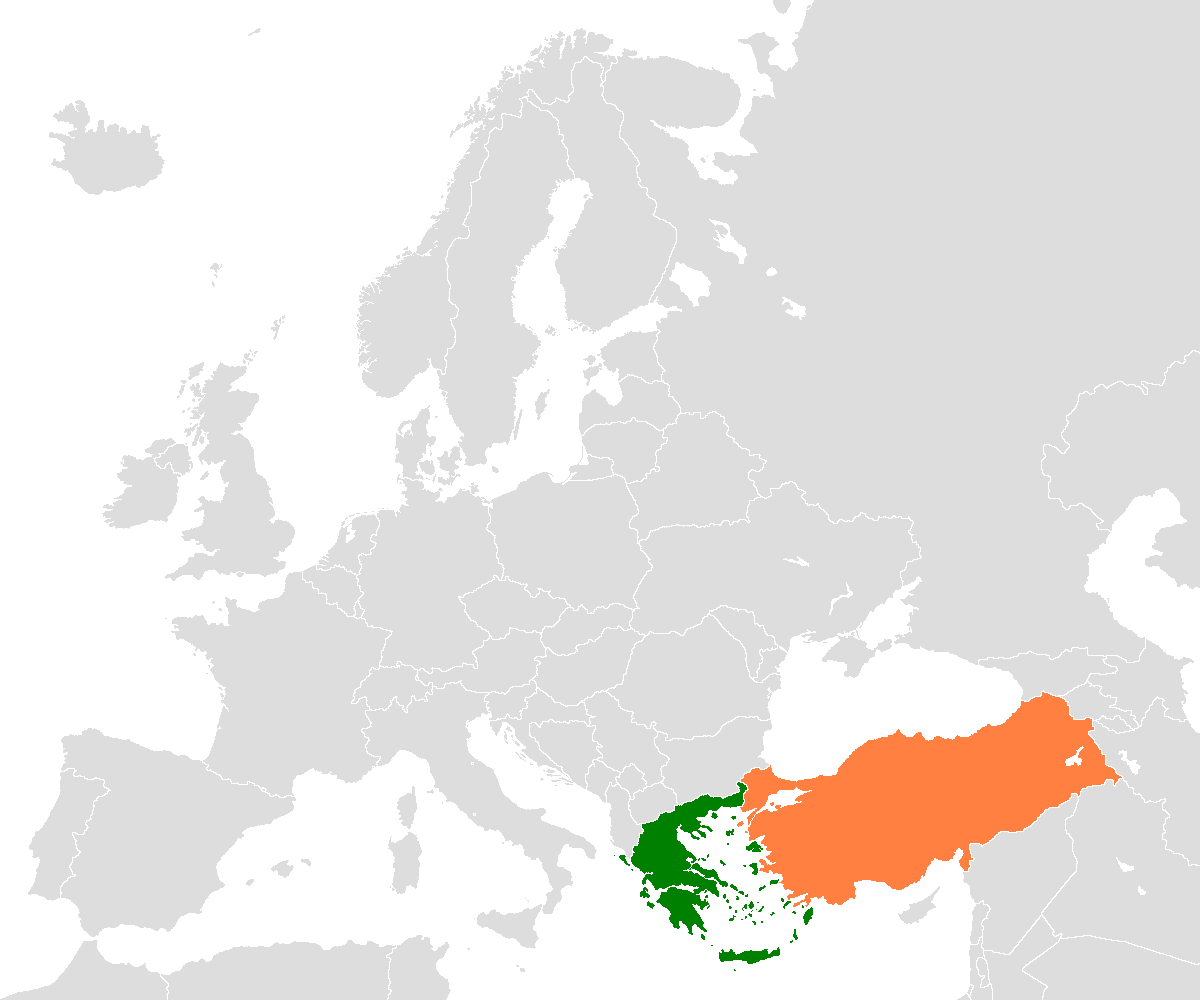
- Map of Europe highlighting Greece and Turkey
Date	19 February – 28 March 1987
Location	Aegean Sea
Result	Initiated bilateral discussions

Parties involved in crisis
Greece	Turkey

Commanders and leaders
Andreas Papandreou	Turgut Özal

The Aegean Crisis (Note: Greek: Κρίση στο Αιγαίο, romanized: Krísi sto Aigaío and Turkish: Ege kıta sahanlığı krizi.) of March 1987 was a political and military standoff between Turkey and Greece over offshore oil exploration near the Greek island of Thasos in the Aegean Sea. The crisis was driven by conflicting claims over the Aegean Sea's continental shelf.

The crisis was triggered when Canadian firm Denison Mines, a member of an international oil consortium, announced plans to drill east of Thasos. The location was beyond Greece's territorial sea, but within waters claimed by Greece and disputed by Turkey. To prevent the operation, the Greek government sought to acquire a controlling share in the oil consortium. However, the Turkish government misread this intervention as an indication that the Greek government was preparing to initiate its own offshore drilling project in the disputed waters. Following a request for clarification, a miscommunication occurred between the Greek deputy foreign minister and the Turkish ambassador. In response, Turkey dispatched a survey vessel to the area with an escort of two Turkish warships. Both nations placed their military forces on high alert. The tension was amplified by the absence of a direct channel of communication between the two governments. The crisis reached its peak when the Turkish government decided to dispatch another survey vessel, escorted by two more warships, while the Turkish prime minister was on a flight and unaware of the decision. The situation raised concerns within the North Atlantic Treaty Organization (NATO) as both countries were members of the alliance.

Diplomats intervened and resolved the misunderstanding. Turkey withdrew its naval vessels under the condition that Greece would not seek oil drilling in the north Aegean Sea beyond its territorial waters. A diplomatic rapprochement followed with a meeting between the prime ministers Andreas Papandreou and Turgut Özal in Davos the following year. The meeting launched the Davos process, aimed at easing tensions in Greek–Turkish relations. However, political opposition in both countries diminished the progress achieved in Davos.

== Background ==
Territorial waters based on (left) 6 nmi and (right) 12 nmi. The former corresponds to the territorial waters during the 1987 crisis, while the latter corresponds to the extent of territorial waters and national airspace defined as a legal right by UNCLOS, to which Greece is a signatory, and Turkey is not.

Aegean islands by demilitarization status

The 1987 Aegean Crisis stemmed from a series of incidents and tensions that developed during the 1970s over sovereign rights to the continental shelf in the Aegean Sea. These tensions became apparent during the negotiations for the United Nations Convention on the Law of the Sea (UNCLOS) that started in 1973. One of the emerging outcomes was UNCLOS to grant participating states the right to extend their territorial waters from six to twelve miles (Note: In this article, "miles" refers to nautical miles.) from their coastlines, including around their islands. If this were to occur, Turkish ports in the Aegean and Black Sea would access the high seas only through waters under Greek sovereignty and jurisdiction. Turkish officials described this potential outcome as turning the Aegean Sea into a "Greek lake". Turkey declared, beginning in 1974 and on several occasions thereafter, that any such extension of Greece's territorial waters would constitute a casus belli (cause for war). Greece refrained from extending its territorial waters in the Aegean Sea while retaining the right to do so at a later date.

The Cyprus crisis of 1974 was a turning point in Greek–Turkish relations. At the time, Cyprus was a republic, following a British colonial rule, under the Treaty of Guarantee (1960), which was an agreement between the British, Greek, and Turkish governments. The majority of the Greek Cypriot population sought enosis (union) with Greece. However, previous Greek governments had been skeptical because of the Turkish minority and assertiveness of Turkey. At the time, Cypriot President Makarios III had abandoned enosis after the republic's creation. This position brought him into conflict with the Greek junta that came to power in Greece in 1967. The junta, dominated by military officers who favored enosis, viewed Makarios as an obstacle. In July 1974, the junta supported a coup by the Cyprus National Guard in an unsuccessful attempt to remove Makarios. The attempt amplified the political crisis, further exacerbating friction between the Greek and Turkish Cypriot communities. Turkey invaded Cyprus, citing the protection of the Turkish Cypriot community and its role as a guarantor power under the 1960 treaty. Turkish forces subsequently occupied approximately the northern third of the island, resulting in the displacement of the Greek Cypriot population and the island's division. The Turkish invasion crystallized Greek perceptions of Turkish military intentions and became a source of tension between Athens and Ankara, contributing to the deterioration of bilateral relations.

The Turkish invasion of Cyprus led to the fall of the junta and the return of the Greek political government. The new Greek government strengthened the military presence on several eastern Aegean islands. Turkey accused Greece of violating the islands' demilitarized status under previous agreements and established the Aegean Army in Izmir in 1975, with amphibious capabilities that further heightened Greek concerns about Turkish intentions. Successive Greek governments maintained that Samothrace and Lemnos had been relieved of their demilitarized status by the Montreux Convention of 1936, while the militarization of other eastern Aegean islands was justified as a response to the presence of the Aegean Army.

Tensions between the two countries escalated during the 1976 Aegean Crisis. Driven by acute supply pressures from the 1973 oil crisis, the Turkish government sought to expand its hydrocarbon exploration in the Aegean Sea. Meanwhile, Greek officials made exaggerated claims in 1973 about significant oil reserve discoveries near Thasos and Lemnos, leading Turkish policymakers to suspect Greece was trying to monopolize the region's oil resources. In August 1976, Ankara dispatched a seismic survey vessel, escorted by a warship, west of the Greek island of Lesbos. The vessel conducted seismological surveys in Turkish territorial waters and in disputed areas of the continental shelf under the high seas. Tensions escalated when the head of the Turkish Nationalist Movement Party claimed that the eastern Aegean islands should have been Turkish. This prompted Greek statements that a forceful response would be forthcoming and that the Greek army was on full alert, bringing the two countries to the brink of war. Subsequently, the Greek government appealed to the UN Security Council (UNSC) and International Court of Justice (ICJ), seeking to defuse the crisis through diplomatic efforts. While the UNSC recommended restraint, the ICJ declared that it lacked jurisdiction to rule on the Aegean continental shelf dispute. Later that year, the two sides signed the Bern Agreement, which froze unilateral exploration activities. However, mutual suspicion persisted. Additionally, after 1978, the two sides had no direct communication between their leaders until after the 1987 crisis.

== Events ==
=== Prelude ===
In 1981, Andreas Papandreou became prime minister of Greece. His government considered the November 1976 Bern Agreement's drilling ban east of Thasos void, since Aegean talks had stalled. However, his government was also entangled in legal disputes in an attempt to control oil companies that wanted to expand exploration beyond Greek territorial waters. The predominant Greek view at the time was that most of the Aegean continental shelf was Greek and so oil companies had to seek permission from the Greek state. Given these circumstances, exploration and extraction of oil beyond Greek territorial waters was improbable.

In the 1983 parliamentary election, Turgut Özal and his party won 45.14% of the vote, enabling him to form a single-party government and become prime minister of Turkey. This result was unexpected because the Turkish military, which had its own candidate, did not support Özal, and a single-party government was also uncommon. For Özal, improving relations with Greece became a top priority of Turkish foreign policy, as he viewed it as a prerequisite for closer ties with the European Community. Toward this goal, he introduced several measures to improve relations with Greece between 1984 and 1986. These included abolishing entry visas for Greek citizens and improving conditions for the Greek minority in Istanbul. He also took initiatives to strengthen trade between the two countries. Despite these overtures, little progress was achieved between the two leaders. Papandreou continued the policy of isolating Turkey in international forums, including its attempt at an association agreement with the EC. The lack of progress led the Turkish military-diplomatic establishment to call for an end to the policy of tolerance toward Greece.

=== Miscommunication ===
Tensions started to rise on 19 February 1987, when the Greek government announced plans to purchase majority shares in foreign companies drilling near Thasos, citing the strategic value of this area. This was followed by an announcement by Denison Mines, a Canadian company, of plans to drill eight to ten miles east of Thasos. Although the proposed drilling site was beyond Greece's six-mile territorial sea, it fell within the twelve-mile limit claimed by Greece, angering the Greek government. The Greek government faced a dilemma: allow exploration and risk a crisis with Turkey, or expropriate the company and take control itself. Although the Greek officials believed it had a strong legal case, it feared a compromise ruling by the courts. Intelligence gathered by Greece in late 1986 also suggested that Turkey was planning to provoke a crisis to force Greece into bilateral negotiations. Papandreou decided to buy the shares of the company to control its activities. However, the Turkish government viewed the company's public statement and the Greek government's purchase of shares as confirmation of Greece's intention to assert its continental shelf claims by drilling in disputed waters. The Greek actions alarmed the Turkish government, which was at the time seeking membership in the European Economic Community (EEC).

Turkish ambassador Nazmi Akıman sought assurances from Greek Deputy Foreign Minister Yannis Kapsis that the Greek government had no intention of drilling beyond its territorial waters. Kapsis, however, asserted Greece's sovereign right to drill anywhere on its continental shelf, even though this was not the Greek government's immediate plan. Akıman interpreted this as an intent to drill beyond six miles, and Ankara warned that any activity in disputed areas would prompt a Turkish response. The Greek government refused to back down, announcing Aegean military exercises on 19 March. On the same day, the Turkish survey vessel Piri Reis was sent to the area with an escort of two Turkish warships. Both governments placed their military forces on high alert.

=== Crisis peak ===
Tensions peaked following strong statements from both prime ministers. Papandreou ordered the armed forces to sink any Turkish ship if it was found in Greek territorial waters. In a similar tone, Özal said that Turkey would respond if Greece interfered with its vessels. He also added that he was waiting for any Greek initiative. Özal was abroad for heart surgery in Texas, United States, and there was no direct communication channel in place. As a result, hard-liners in Ankara drove Turkey's reaction, undermining Özal's efforts to ease the strained relations. On 26 March, the Turkish Council of Ministers scheduled the survey vessel RV MTA Sismik 1 (Note: The appearance of Sismik 1 produced a déjà vu sensation to the Greeks since it also participated in the 1976 Aegean Crisis.) to go to disputed waters around the Greek islands of Lemnos, Samothrace, and Lesbos. RV MTA Sismik 1 would be escorted by two (Note: Although the initial announcement said seven Turkish warships, two warships eventually escorted Sismik 1.) Turkish warships. Özal was unaware of this decision as he was on a flight from the United States to London. In the meantime, the Greek government ordered the mobilization of its naval vessels and personnel, and by 27 March, a significant deployment of ships had been made in strategically important areas. As the situation escalated, the US (particularly Robert V. Keeley, US ambassador in Athens) and Britain's Lord Carrington, the Secretary General of NATO, urged Greece and Turkey to avoid the use of force and offered to act as mediators. Both of them met with Özal upon his return to Ankara via London. On 27 March, Özal attempted to de-escalate the tension; he spoke to BBC Radio, "There is no reason for tension. Turkey will not proceed to explore in the disputed areas, if Greece would not initiate exploration... The moment they go out we will also go out... The exploration vessel and our warships will remain within our territorial waters."

Papandreou wanted to hold NATO, and especially the United States, responsible for failing to restrain one of their members. He ordered the suspension of the operation of the NATO communication base in Nea Makri (a town east of Athens). He also sent the Greek foreign minister, Karolos Papoulias, to Bulgaria, a Warsaw Pact member, for consultations with President Todor Zhivkov.

=== Resolution ===
In the meantime, Yiannis Boutos, a former minister and friend of Papandreou, learned of the escalating situation during a meeting with Turkish ambassador Akıman. Boutos rushed to Papandreou's home to brief him, who was unaware of the Kapsis–Akıman exchange. Acting on the Prime Minister's behalf, Boutos assured Akıman that Greece's share purchase aimed to stop, not extend, drilling east of Thasos. Reassured, Akıman confirmed this with Kapsis and informed his government. The crisis ended on 28 March 1987, when Özal declared that Turkey would withdraw its vessels as long as Greece refrained from drilling beyond its territorial waters.

== Aftermath ==
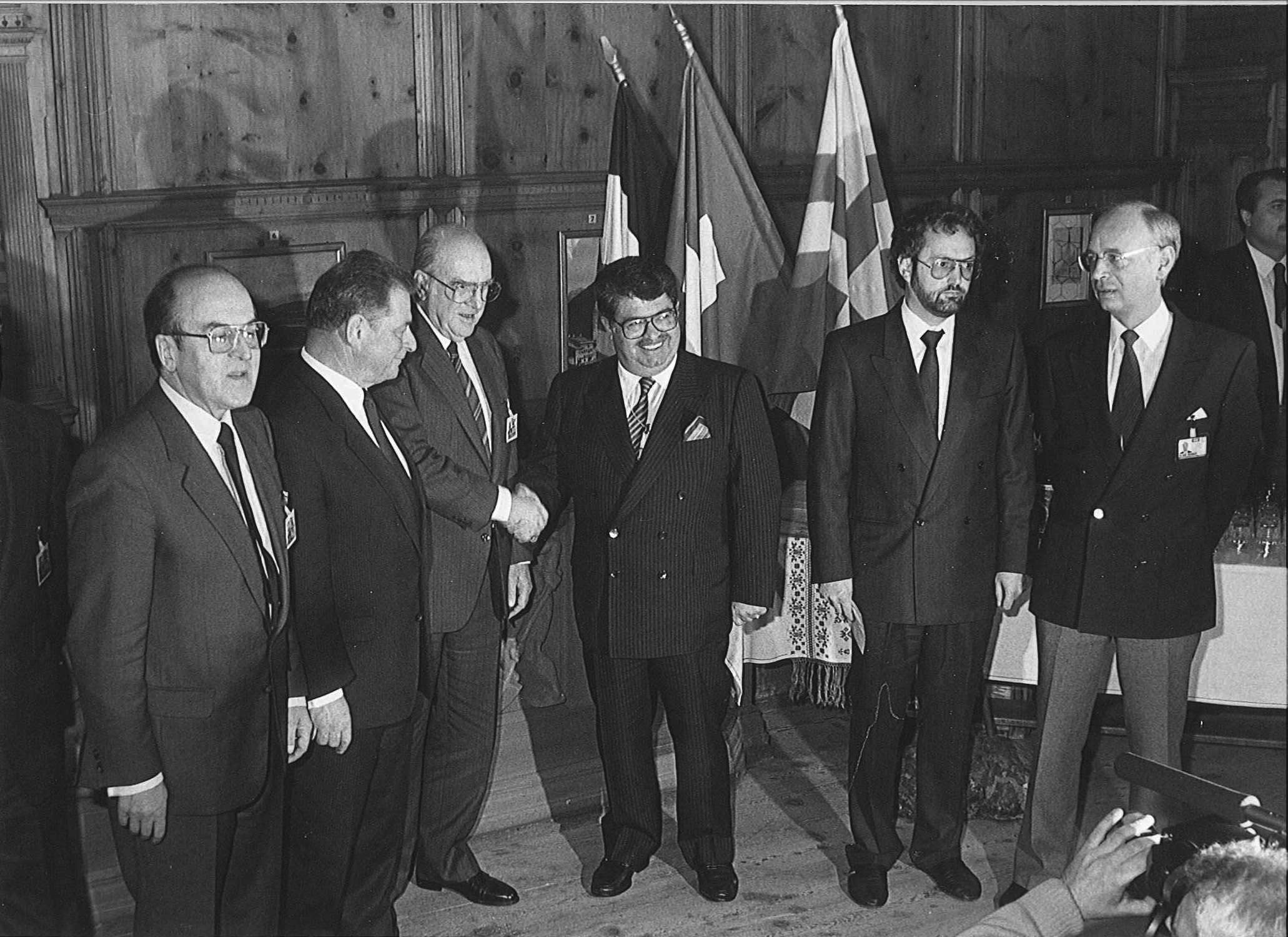
Prime Ministers Andreas Papandreou and Turgut Özal shake hands at the World Economic Forum Annual Meeting in 1988 at Davos, Switzerland.

A day after the crisis ended, Papandreou communicated with Özal through diplomatic channels over secret talking points diffusing the tense atmosphere.

In January 1988, Papandreou and Özal met at the annual World Economic Forum at Davos, Switzerland, to improve relations between their two countries. Papandreou described the meeting as "a great event for the two nations," and Özal described it as a breakthrough. The two leaders said that they had reached a no-war understanding. They also agreed to establish a hotline between the two governments. Two joint committees were also established to promote closer political and economic relations: the Political Committee focused on political cooperation, while the Economic Committee focused on economic cooperation. The agreed framework of collaboration was named the Davos process. Papandreou sought this agreement to improve his image as a man of peace, while Özal wanted to improve Turkey's image abroad as his country was under evaluation for full membership of the European Community.

On 27 May 1988, the Political Committee met at the Athenian suburb of Vouliagmeni. There, the Greek foreign minister Karolos Papoulias and his Turkish counterpart Mesut Yılmaz signed a memorandum of understanding on confidence-building measures, aimed at reducing tensions and preventing future Greek–Turkish confrontations. Özal, accompanied by Turkish entrepreneurs, visited Athens on 13–15 June 1988. Despite the previous meetings, little progress was made until a subsequent meeting in Ankara on 6–9 September of the same year, where a document was signed establishing an understanding on preventing accidents in international waters. Other meetings between the two sides focused on economic cooperation, in particular trade and tourism, and cultural exchanges. Nevertheless, little progress was achieved on the continental shelf dispute. The two sides disagreed on the scope of their disputes: Greece focused on continental-shelf delimitation, whereas Turkey sought to include territorial waters, airspace, and the militarization of the eastern Aegean islands. Turkey favored bilateral negotiations, while Greece advocated international arbitration.

Political opposition in both countries resulted in the abandonment of the Davos agreement. Özal faced resistance from the Turkish military-diplomatic establishment and from Turkish-Cypriot leader Rauf Denktaş. On 6 June 1988, Papandreou was criticized by the opposition for focusing on bilateral disputes and shelving the Cyprus dispute and apologized from the podium of the Hellenic Parliament. Papandreou attempted to formally include Cyprus as a key issue during Özal's visit to Athens a week later, but Özal refused. In autumn, Papandreou yielded to the opposition and denounced the Davos process. By the end of 1988, Greece reported 338 Turkish violations of the Greek airspace, 22 overflights of Greek sovereign space, and 42 mock dogfights. Historians John S. Koliopoulos and Thanos Veremis consider that the momentum gained in Davos to improve the bilateral relations gradually ended in 1989. Moreover, on 20 December 1989, the European Commission rejected the Turkish application for full membership in the EEC, which reduced the incentives for a diplomatic solution.

Tensions resurfaced over a series of incidents starting in 1994 and culminated in the Imia Crisis in January 1996. Nevertheless, the 1988 Papoulias–Yılmaz Memorandum established after the 1987 crisis provided principles upon which subsequent confidence-building efforts between Greece and Turkey continued to build. Examples include the 1997 Madrid Declaration after the Imia Crisis and the Athens Declaration on Friendly Relations and Good-Neighborliness in 2023.

== Sources ==
Books

- Aydın, Mustafa (2004). "Contemporary Turkish-Greek Relations: Constraints and Opportunities". In Aydın, Mustafa; Ifantis, Kostas (eds.). Turkish-Greek Relations: the Security Dilemma in the Aegean. London and New York: Routledge. pp. 21–51. ISBN 0-203-50191-8.
- Veremis, Thanos (1993). "Defence and Security Policies under PASOK". In Clogg, Richard (ed.). Greece, 1981–89: The Populist Decade. London and New York: Palgrave Macmillan. pp. 181–189. ISBN 978-1-349-23056-3.
- Clogg, Richard (2013). A Concise History of Greece. Cambridge: Cambridge University Press. ISBN 978-1-107-65644-4.
- Heraclides, Alexis (2010). The Greek-Turkish Conflict in the Aegean. London: Palgrave Macmillan. ISBN 978-0-230-28339-8.
- Katsoulas, Spyros (2021). The United States and Greek-Turkish Relations, The Guardian's Dilemma. London and New York: Taylor & Francis. ISBN 978-1-000-51433-9.
- Keridis, Dimitris (2009). Historical dictionary of modern Greece. Lanham, Maryland: The Scarecrow Press. ISBN 978-0-8108-6312-5.
- Koliopoulos, John S.; Veremis, Thanos M. [in Greek] (2009). Modern Greece A History Since 1821. Oxford: Wiley-Blackwell. ISBN 978-1-4443-1483-0.
- Stergiou, Andreas (2021). Greece's Ostpolitik Dealing with the 'Devil'. Cham: Springer International Publishing. ISBN 978-3-030-61129-3.
- Tsakonas, Panagiotes (2015). The Incomplete Breakthrough in Greek-Turkish Relations: Grasping Greece's Socialization Strategy. London: Palgrave Macmillan UK. ISBN 978-0-230-27807-3.

Journals and reports

- Aydın, Mustafa (1997). "Cacophony in the Aegean Contemporary Turkish-Greek Relations". The Turkish Yearbook of International Relations (27): 109–140. doi:10.1501/Intrel_0000000256.
- Ayman, S. Gülden (2001). "The Kardak (Imia) Crisis and Turkish-Greek Relations". Etudes Helleniques/Hellenic Studies. 9 (2): 49–72. ISSN 0824-8621.
- Avar, Yusuf; Lin, Yu Chou (2019). "Aegean Disputes Between Turkey and Greece: Turkish and Greek Claims and Motivations in the Framework of Legal and Political Perspectives". International Journal of Politics and Security. 1 (1): 57–70.
- Kyle, Keith (1997). Cyprus: In Search of Peace (PDF). Minority Rights Group (Report). No. 3.
- Veremis, Thanos (1996). "Greek-Turkish Relations: Crisis in the Aegean". Études helléniques/Hellenic Studies. 4 (2): 19–32. ISSN 0824-8621.
- Greece and Turkey: Aegean Issues — Background and Recent Developments (PDF). CRS Report for Congress (Report). 21 August 1997. CRS Report 97-799.
- Greek Independence Day (PDF). Congressional Record – Senate (Report). 22 March 1988. pp. 4625–4712.

Newspapers

- Cowell, Alan (28 March 1987). "Greece and Turkey Alert Forces as Tension Builds on Oil Search". The New York Times.
- Cowell, Alan (29 March 1987). "Greeks and Turks Ease Aegean Crisis". The New York Times.
- "Greece Opposes Reported Turkish Oil Search in Aegean". UPI archives. UPI. 26 March 1987.
- Varvitsioti, Eleni (14 February 2019). "Greece, Turkey to draft framework to reduce tension". Kathimerini. Archived from the original on 14 April 2021.
- "Mitsotakis, Erdogan sign 'Athens Declaration on Friendly Relations and Good-Neighborliness'". Kathimerini. 7 December 2023.
