= Davos process =

The Davos process was the name given to the process of reconciliation, rapprochement between Greece and Turkey, conducted in 1988 between Andreas Papandreou and Turkish prime minister Turgut Özal. Their meeting took place at the annual World Economic Forum meeting in Davos, Switzerland.
