= Exclusive economic zone of Greece =

Greece has claimed an Exclusive Economic Zone (EEZ) with a total size of 505,572 km^{2} (195,202 mi^{2}), which is the 53rd largest in the world.

== Geography ==
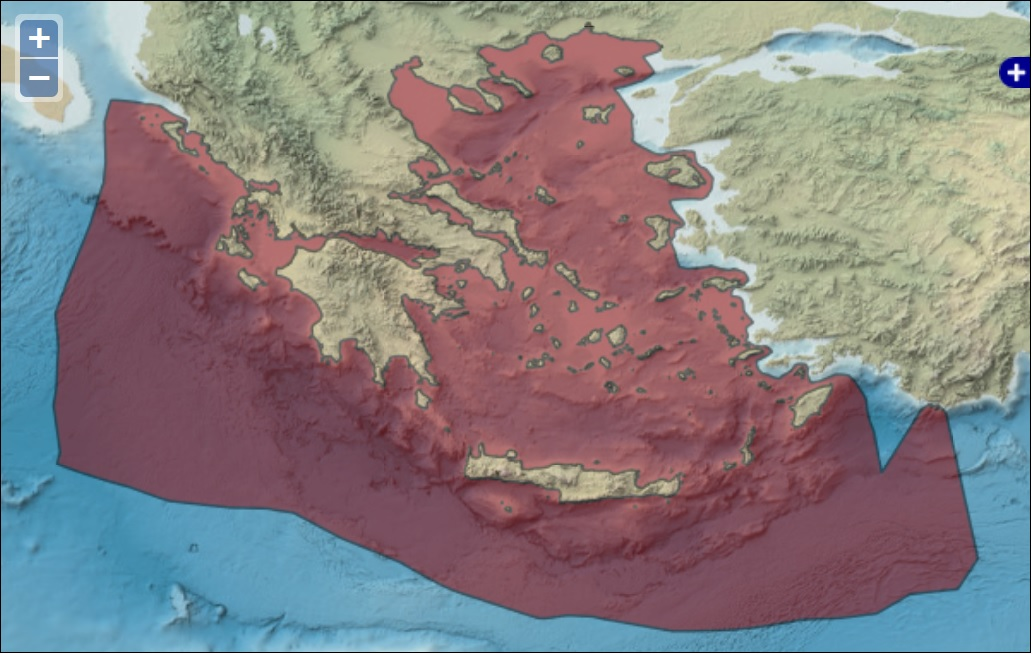
Claimed Exclusive Economic Zone of Greece.

Greece forms the southernmost part of the Balkan Peninsula in the Mediterranean Sea. It includes many small islands which vary between 1,200 and 6,000 in the Aegean Sea and the Ionian Sea. The largest islands are Crete, Euboea, Lesbos, Rhodes and Chios. The term archipelago originates from the Aegean Islands. Crete is the fifth largest island in the Mediterranean Sea. Greece's EEZ is bordered to the west by Albania and Italy, to the south by Libya and Egypt, and to the east by Turkey and Cyprus.

EEZ Area of Greece
Territory	km^{2}	sq mi	Notes
Total	505,572	195,202	

== Agreements ==
On 8 June 2020, Greece signed an agreement with Italy, establishing an EEZ between the two countries and resolving longstanding issues over fishing rights in the Ionian Sea.

On 6 August 2020, Greece signed an agreement with Egypt designating an EEZ in the Eastern Mediterranean between the two countries. Both agreements are in line with Greece's claimed EEZ as per UNCLOS 1982 as well as customary international law.

In October 2020, Greece and Albania agreed to refer their EEZ boundary delimitation to the International Court.

Of the remaining neighbouring countries, Greece is yet to sign EEZ boundary agreements with Libya, Turkey and Cyprus.

== Disputes ==
Turkey does not recognize that islands possess a legal continental shelf or EEZ beyond their territorial waters, arguing that such zones should be measured from the continental mainland and that islands on the "wrong side" of a median line should be ignored.

== Gas pipeline projects ==
There are published maps that describe the course of the gas pipeline which will transfer gas produced by American Νoble Εnergy Ltd. from the Leviathan reservoir to Europe, through an undersea pipeline (EastMed pipeline) crossing Greece. The mining and operating part will be undertaken by an American company. By this proposal, Israel offers an advantage that Greece can use during negotiation procedures to support its claims on the area. In practice, this cooperation will set up an energy coalition between Greece, Cyprus, and Israel.

== See also ==
- Egypt-Greece relations
- Greece-Italy relations
- Greece-Libya relations
- Greece-Turkey relations
- 2018 Cyprus gas dispute
- Cyprus problem
- Cyprus–Turkey maritime zones dispute
- Exclusive economic zone of Italy
- Imia/Kardak
- Libya (GNA)–Turkey maritime deal
- Libyan Sea
