= Duty to render assistance =

International law of the sea

The duty to render assistance is the title of Article 98 provided in the 1982 United Nations Convention on the Law of the Sea (UNCLOS) that generally outlines states responsibilities in assisting people found in distress at sea. Article 98 is located in Part VII of the Convention, also known as Convention on the High Seas. Under Article 98 in UNCLOS flag-states are responsible for ensuring that ship masters (also called a sea captain) rescue people in distress when found at sea, where feasible, while coastal states are obligated to maintain search and rescue services. The rule has long standing customary origins dating back to the 16th and 17th century but was first codified in international law through the United Nations in 1958. Based on Article 58(2) of UNCLOS the rule extends to all maritime zones. The implementation of the rule has led to several legal tensions such as the prosecution of NGO search and rescue vessels in the Mediterranean. This is due to the way Article 98 interconnects with states' domestic immigration and border policy as well as the legal obligations from International Refugee and Human Rights Law.

Duty to render assistance

1. Every State shall require the master of a ship flying its flag, in so far as he can do so without serious danger to the ship, the crew or the passengers:
  - to render assistance to any person found at sea in danger of being lost;
  - to proceed with all possible speed to the rescue of persons in distress, if informed of their need of assistance, in so far as such action may reasonably be expected of him;
  - after a collision, to render assistance to the other ship, its crew and its passengers and, where possible, to inform the other ship of the name of his own ship, its port of registry and the nearest port at which it will call.
2. Every coastal State shall promote the establishment, operation and maintenance of an adequate and effective search and rescue service regarding safety on and over the sea and, where circumstances so require, by way of mutual regional arrangements cooperate with neighbouring States for this purpose.

— United Nations Convention on the Law of the Sea, Article 98

== Application ==
Under Article 98 of the United Nations Convention on the Law of the Sea (UNCLOS), ship masters are obligated to render assistance to any person found in peril at sea, and states are required to cooperate in establishing and maintaining effective search and rescue services. Shipmasters' duty to rescue is specified under the International Convention for the Safety of Life at Sea (SOLAS) which reads as follows under regulation 33 (Chapter V): "the master of a ship at sea which is in a position to be able to provide assistance, on receiving information from any source that persons are in distress at sea, is bound to proceed with all speed to their assistance(...)" Ship masters, therefore, have a duty under international law to proceed to the assistance of persons in distress at sea. UNCLOS additionally establishes the framework of maritime zones—including the territorial sea and Exclusive Economic Zone—which serves to allocate search and Rescue jurisdiction among coastal states. As such, UNCLOS provides the foundational legal basis for search and rescue obligations internationally, while the more specific operational and procedural requirements are set out in dedicated International Maritime Organization (IMO) instruments, notably the International Convention on Maritime Search and Rescue (also known as the SAR Convention).

Under Article 98(1)(a) of UNCLOS, flag States must ensure that masters of ships flying their flag come to the aid of anyone found in danger of being lost at sea. This obligation can take many forms, from supplying fuel or navigational guidance to accompanying a vessel for a stretch of its route, and may in some cases require carrying out an actual rescue. Article 98(1)(b) further obliges the master to head toward persons in distress as quickly as possible once made aware of their situation, provided doing so is a reasonable expectation given the circumstances. The master need only act where it would not put the ship itself, its crew, or its passengers in serious peril. Because the convention gives no objective standard for what counts as sufficiently serious danger, this assessment is generally understood to rest with the master's own judgment, exercised in light of the specific conditions of each incident. This individual duty operates alongside a broader obligation on coastal States, set out in Article 98(2), to establish and maintain functioning search-and-rescue capabilities.

Both provision 98(1)(a) and Article 98(1)(b) attribute the master of the ship discretion in interpreting the relative danger of a situation in relation to international law which can complicate matters. An often cited case on a captain's discretion in rescuing people in distress at sea can be found in USS Dubuque incident (1988). According to the Naval History and Heritage Command, the captain of the ship fatally underestimated the threat to the passengers of an overcrowded Vietnamese boat carrying refugees. The aftermath was an estimated 58 deaths due to starvation and exposure to the sea as well as grim tales of desperate seafarers resorting to cannibalism to survive.

The duty to render assistance also obligates involved parties to bring rescued persons to a place where they can safely disembark. In 2004, the Maritime Safety Committee (MSC) of the International Maritime Organization adopted non-binding amendments to the SOLAS and SAR Conventions, which took effect on 1 July 2006. According to these guidelines the vessel that provides the search and rescue can be a "place of safety" for the rescuees but only temporarily. From there on the MSC guidelines direct the flag state and the coastal state to cooperate in disembarking the rescued persons while ensuring a swift disembarkation to relieve the ship master of his duties as fast as possible. If the government responsible for the search and rescue cannot safely disembark the rescued persons elsewhere the MSC principles hold that this government should accept the disembarkation of the individuals in accordance with their own immigration laws.

== History ==
=== Customary origins ===
The duty to assist mariners in distress has been described as part of international customary law since the emergence of international law in the 16th and 17th century. The rule was first accepted as soft law during the 1885 Antwerp Congress, hosted by King of Belgium, Leopold the 2nd, which included representatives of governments, lawyers, maritime associations, and several states from the Americas and Asia. The Antwerp Congress adopted a resolution that contains all the essential elements of "the duty to render assistance" as it is was later expressed in UNCLOS. After the 1885 Antwerp Congress followed the 1889 Washington Conference, which was the yet biggest intergovernmental conference on safety of life at sea.

Representatives from the following States attended the Conference: Austria-Hungary, Belgium, Brazil, Chili, China, Costa Rica, Denmark, France, Germany, Great Britain, Guatemala, Hawaii, Honduras, Italy, Japan, Mexico, Netherlands, Nicaragua, Norway, Portugal, Russia, Siam, Spain, Sweden, Turkey, Uruguay, Venezuela and United States. The Proceedings of the Washington Conference confirmed the existence of customary international law on safety at sea, describing the duty to render assistance as "obvious enough".

=== The 1958 Geneva Convention on the High Seas ===
The first codification of the duty to render assistance appeared in Article 12 of the 1958 Geneva Convention on the High Seas, one of four conventions produced by the first United Nations Conference on the Law of the Sea in 1958. The Convention on the High Seas entered into force on 30 September 1962. The parties to the conference also codified the notion of the high seas, in the rules of the Geneva Convention on the High Seas of 29 April 1958 including article 12.

== Codification in UNCLOS III ==
Article 98 of UNCLOS is a near-verbatim descendant of Article 12 of the 1958 Convention on the High Seas, carried forward through the Third United Nations Conference on the Law of the Sea (UNCLOS III), which met between 1973 and 1982. Some changes were however made, and the most substantial change was the addition of promotion of Search and Rescue services. Article 98 states that parties to the treaty commit to promoting "the establishment, operation and maintenance" of search and rescue services, which is a substantial further commitment to the duty to render assistance at sea. Minor changes were also made to Article 98 (previously Article 12) such as the phrasing of flag-state-rules, the introduction of gender-neutral language as well as changes in the punctuation.

== Extension to the Exclusive Economic Zone ==
Since Article 98 sits within Part VII of the Convention, governing the high seas, its formal textual scope is specified to the high seas (e.d. waters beyond the EEZ which is 200 nautical miles from a country's coastal baseline) and explicitly applies "to all parts of the sea that are not included in the Exclusive Economic Zone, in the territorial sea or in the internal waters of a State, or in the archipelagic waters of an archipelagic State". However, Article 58(2) of UNCLOS applies the high-seas provisions on the duty to render assistance, together with other high-seas obligations such as flag-state jurisdiction and the suppression of piracy, to the Exclusive Economic Zone (EEZ) as well. This means that the duty to render assistance in practice extends across all maritime zones.

== Legal tensions ==
The duty to render assistance under UNCLOS has been cause for legal tension due to the intersection with the International Refugee and Human Rights Law and states' domestic immigration and border policy. Human rights bodies and the Office of the United Nations High Commissioner for Refugees (UNHCR) maintain that the universal obligation of "non-refoulement" - meaning rescued individuals cannot be pushed back or handed over to an unsafe place - is customary law and applies wherever a state exercises effective control. The question of when interception results in a flag state's effective control of the vessel and the people on board is, however, a live one.

Article 98 itself contains no exceptions, and the duty to rescue therefore applies equally to all including asylum seekers and other migrants found in distress at sea. Moreover, according to the International Maritime Organization "(...) the duty to rescue applies in all maritime zones, to all persons found in distress at sea, regardless of their nationality, their legal or other status, their reason for being at sea, or the circumstances that gave rise to the situation of distress. Accordingly, persons seeking to migrate irregularly through maritime channels – or even persons who are committing or intending to commit crimes at sea, must be rescued when in distress".

=== Clash with immigration policy ===
The relation between human rights and illegal immigration has been debated following the sharp rise in migrant crossings and deaths in the Central Mediterranean during and after 2014. Between 2014 and 2018 a total of 18,618 migrants died trying to cross the Mediterranean. As a result of the increased migrant crossings and deaths in the Mediterranean, Sea Rescue NGO's have increased their operations, saving lives consistent with Article 98 of UNCLOS and the SAR Convention. Between 2014 and 2019 over 120,000 immigrants were rescued off of the coast of Libya by NGO vessels. In the aftermath of this, NGO search and rescue activities have faced growing criticism, and claims that these organizations enable irregular migration have led to legal investigations by authorities in Italy and Malta. Both countries also made policy measures limiting the access of NGO vessels to European ports. While NGOs subjected to such investigations have consistently been acquitted, the combined effect of criminal proceedings and restrictive policies implemented in Italy since 2017 has substantially impeded non-governmental search and rescue operations.

In another example of legal tension stemming from the use of Article 98 in practice is what is known as the "Tampa Affair". Here the Norwegian container ship MV Tampa encountered and rescued 433 asylum seekers, predominantly Hazara Afghans, from the sinking Indonesian fishing boat Palapa 1 in international waters near Australia's Christmas Island, after being directed to do so by the Australian Maritime Safety Authority. The Australian Government refused the disembarkation of the rescued asylum seekers and when the Norwegian captain Arne Rinnan entered Australian territorial waters regardless, the Australian government deployed Special Air Service troops to board the vessel and prevent it from proceeding further. This triggered a diplomatic dispute between Norway and Australia and became a catalyst for Australia's new "border protection" policy.

== See also ==
- Search and rescue
- United Nations Convention on the Law of the Sea
- Convention on the High Seas
