= Ship registration =

Process by which a ship is documented

Ship registration is the process by which a ship is documented and given the nationality of the country to which the ship has been documented. The nationality allows a ship to travel internationally as it is proof of ownership of the vessel.

International law requires that every ship be registered in a country, called its flag state. A ship is subject to the law of its flag state. It is usual to say that the ship sails under the flag of the country of registration.

A ship's flag state exercises regulatory control over the vessel and is required to inspect it regularly, certify the ship's equipment and crew, and issue safety and pollution prevention documents. The organization which actually registers the ship is known as its registry. Registries may be governmental or private agencies. In some cases, such as the United States' Alternative Compliance Program, the registry can assign a third party to administer inspections.

A register that is open only to ships of its own nation is known as a traditional or national register. Registers that are open to foreign-owned ships are known as open registries and are sometimes called flags of convenience.

== History ==
Ship registration has been done since business on the seas has been important. Originally meant to control ships carrying cargo in European seafaring countries, it was used to make sure ships were being built in the local country, with crews predominantly of the local country. Since then, ship registration has been used to document ships for ownership. Documentation provides definite evidence of nationality for international purposes and provides financing opportunities with the availability of preferred mortgages on documented vessels.

== Requirements for registration ==
Vessels that operate internationally or cross international borders are required to be registered. Some jurisdictions also require vessels that only operate in territorial waters to register on their national register, and some forbid foreign-flagged vessels from trading between ports within the country (a practice known as cabotage). The country of registration is a ship's flag state and determines its nationality as well as which country's laws govern its operation and the behavior of its crew. A country will specify legal requirements for registration of a ship in its domestic laws, for example, in the UK, the Merchant Shipping Act 1995 details British law on entitlement for ship registration, including qualifications, pre-conditions and the machinery for registration.

Each registry has its own rules as to the types of vessels that it will accept for registration. The Liberian Registry, for example, registers seagoing vessels of more than 500 net tons that conduct foreign trade. Vessels over the age of 20 require a waiver as well as the vessel's classification society being willing to issue statutory certificates to the vessel. Vessels 15 years or older must have a Status Report of the vessel's Special Survey to be reviewed by Marine Safety. Registries charge a registration fee.

== Link to flag state ==
There must be a "genuine link" between a vessel and its flag state. Article 5(1) of the Geneva Convention on the High Seas of 1958, which came into effect in 1962, requires that "the state must effectively exercise its jurisdiction and control in administrative, technical and social matters over ships flying its flag." There are 63 states party to that Convention. The principle was repeated in Article 91 of the United Nations Convention on the Law of the Sea of 1982 (UNCLOS), which came into effect in 1994. That Convention has 167 parties.

In 1986, the United Nations Conference on Trade and Development attempted to solidify the genuine link concept in the United Nations Convention on Conditions for Registration of Ships. The Convention on Conditions for Registration of Ships would require that a flag state be linked to its ships either by having an economic stake in the ownership of its ships or by providing mariners to crew the ships. To come into force, the 1986 treaty requires 40 signatories whose combined tonnage exceeds 25% of the world total. To date, only 14 countries have signed the treaty.

National or closed registries typically require that a ship be owned by national interests, and at least partially crewed by its citizens. Open registries do not have such requirements; some offer on-line registration, and one guaranteed completion in less than a day.

=== Unflagged vessels ===
Ships operated illegally, such as by pirates, or narco-submarines, are not normally registered by the operators (although a registered ship may be captured or used covertly for illegal purposes).

== See also ==
- Flag of convenience
- Port state control
