= Makroulo =

Greek islet in the Libyan Sea

Native name: Μακρουλό
- Location within Greece

Geography
- Coordinates: 34.953°N 26.128°E
- Archipelago: Cretan Islands
- Area: 0.088 km^{2} (0.034 sq mi)

Administration
- Greece
- Region: Crete
- Regional unit: Lasithi

Demographics
- Population: 0 (2001)

Makroulo (Greek: Μακρουλό, "long"), is an uninhabited Greek islet, located south of cape Goudero on the coast of Lasithi, eastern Crete, in the Libyan Sea. It forms a close group of islands with Koufonisi, Marmaro, Strongyli, and Trachilos.

== See also ==
- List of islands of Greece
