= Gaidouronisi =

Gaidouronisi (Greek: Γαϊδουρονήσι, "donkey island") is the name of the following Greek islands:

- Chrysi (island), Crete
- Patroklos (Attica)
