= Convention on Fishing and Conservation of the Living Resources of the High Seas =

1958 international treaty

- Signed: 29 April 1958
- Location: Geneva, Switzerland
- Effective: 20 March 1966
- Signatories: 35
- Parties: 39
- Languages: Chinese, English, French, Russian and Spanish
- https://legal.un.org/ilc/texts/instruments/english/conventions/8_1_1958_fishing.pdf

The Convention on Fishing and Conservation of Living Resources of the High Seas is an agreement that was designed to solve through international cooperation the problems involved in the conservation of living resources of the high seas, considering that because of the development of modern technology some of these resources are in danger of being overexploited. The convention opened for signature on 29 April 1958 and entered into force on 20 March 1966.

== Participation ==
Parties – (39): Australia, Belgium, Bosnia and Herzegovina, Burkina Faso, Cambodia, Colombia, Republic of the Congo, Denmark, Dominican Republic, Fiji, Finland, France, Haiti, Jamaica, Kenya, Lesotho, Madagascar, Malawi, Malaysia, Mauritius, Mexico, Montenegro, Netherlands, Nigeria, Portugal, Senegal, Serbia, Sierra Leone, Solomon Islands, South Africa, Spain, Switzerland, Thailand, Tonga, Trinidad and Tobago, Uganda, United Kingdom, United States, Venezuela.

Countries that have signed, but not yet ratified – (21): Afghanistan, Argentina, Bolivia, Canada, Costa Rica, Cuba, Ghana, Iceland, Indonesia, Iran, Ireland, Israel, Lebanon, Liberia, Nepal, New Zealand, Pakistan, Panama, Sri Lanka, Tunisia, Uruguay.

== See also ==
- Environmental effects of fishing
- United Nations Convention on the Law of the Sea
- Convention on the High Seas
