= Trachilos =

Trachilos (Greek: Τράχηλος) may refer to:

- Trachilos islet, a Greek islet located south of cape Goudero on the coast of Lasithi, eastern Crete.
- Trachilos, a village west of Kissamos, in the Chania Prefecture at Crete. Trachilos footprints discovered near this place.
- Trachilos, a beach at Sitia, on Crete.
- Trachilos, a beach at the island of Kalamos.
- Trachilos Cape, at the island of Tilos.
- Trachilos Cape, at the island of Antiparos.
