= Strongyli (Crete) =

Native name: Στρογγυλή
- Location within Greece

Geography
- Coordinates: 34.958°N 26.133°E
- Archipelago: Cretan Islands
- Area: 0.151 km^{2} (0.058 sq mi)

Administration
- Greece
- Region: Crete
- Regional unit: Lasithi

Demographics
- Population: 0 (2001)

Strongyli (Greek: Στρογγυλή, "round"), also known as Strongylo, is an uninhabited Greek islet, located south of cape Goudero on the coast of Lasithi, eastern Crete, in the Libyan Sea. It forms a close group of islands with Koufonisi, Makroulo, Marmaro, and Trachilos.

== See also ==
- List of islands of Greece
