= Greece–Libya relations =

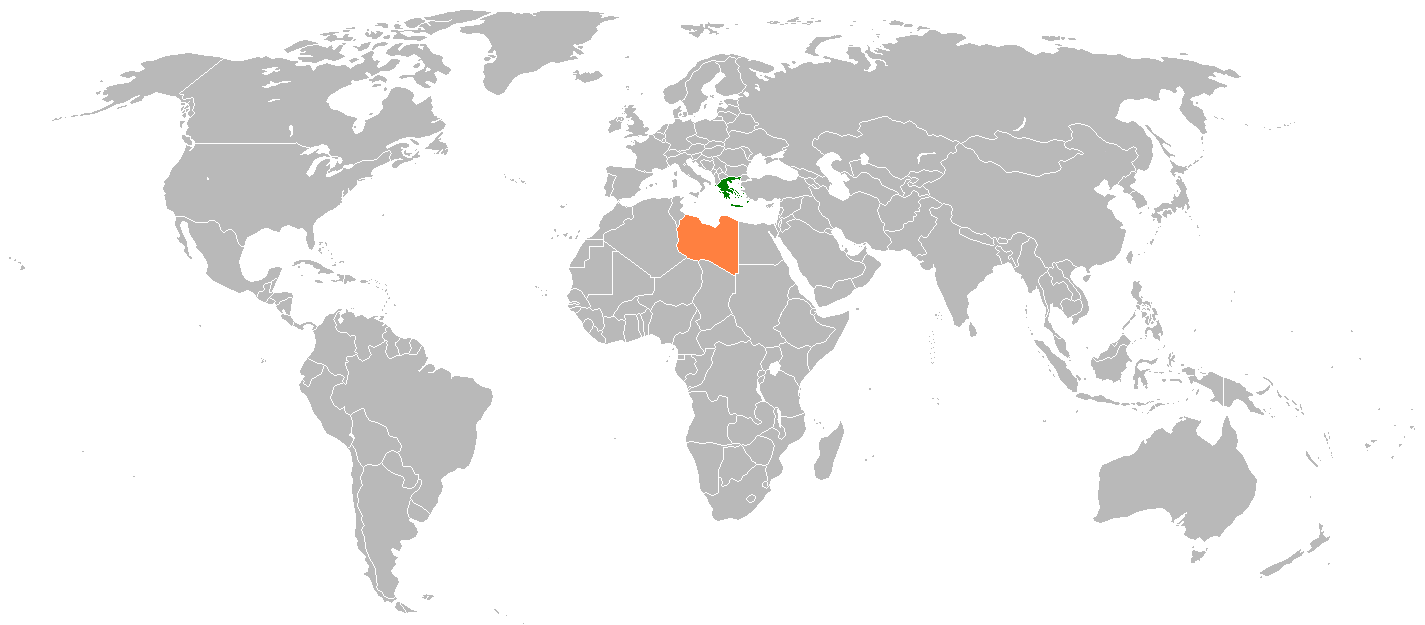

- Greece: Libya

Greece–Libya relations are the bilateral relations between Greece and Libya. The two countries are members of the United Nations.

== History ==
Diplomatic relations between Greece and Libya date back to 1952, when Libya's independence was formally recognized by the United Nations. Relations between the two countries had been traditionally friendly, especially during the 1980s and 1990s, when the personal friendship between Muammar Gaddafi and Greek socialist Prime Minister Andreas Papandreou contributed to close ties between the two countries. Greece provided continued military training in its military academies to future Libyan career officers, well into the early 2000s.

=== During and after the Libyan Civil War ===
Due to the Libyan Civil War, in 2014 Greece closed its embassy in Tripoli, while Libya continued to be represented in Greece through its embassy in Athens. The signing in 2019 of the Libya (GNA)–Turkey maritime deal fuelled Greece’s strong reaction and condemnation, also followed by concerns raised for its legality by other countries in the region, the international community and political powers within Libya itself, including the rival Tobruk-based government led by Libya's Parliament (House of Representatives) and the Libyan National Army. Greece regarded it as "void" and "geographically absurd", because it ignored the presence of the Greek islands of Crete, Kasos, Karpathos, Kastellorizo and Rhodes between the Turkish–Libyan coasts. This subsequently led to the expulsion of the Libyan ambassador from Greece and deterioration of relations between Greece and the GNA.

Following political change at the head of Government in Libya in 2021, and in an effort to stabilise relations and increase Greece’s diplomatic presence in the country, the reopening of the Greek Embassy in Tripoli and a new Consulate General in Benghazi were announced by the Greek Ministry of Foreign Affairs.

== Bilateral partnerships ==
During the COVID-19 pandemic, Greece donated 200,000 vaccines to Libya.

== Resident diplomatic missions ==
- Libya has an embassy in Athens.
- Greece has an embassy in Tripoli, and a consulate general in Benghazi.

== See also ==
- Foreign relations of Greece
- List of diplomatic missions in Greece
- List of diplomatic missions of Greece
- Foreign relations of Libya
- List of diplomatic missions of Libya
- List of diplomatic missions in Libya
