= Trachilos (islet) =

Greek islet in the Libyan Sea

Native name: Τράχηλος
- Location within Greece

Geography
- Coordinates: 34.919°N 26.131°E
- Archipelago: Cretan Islands
- Area: 0.153 km^{2} (0.059 sq mi)

Administration
- Greece
- Region: Crete
- Regional unit: Lasithi

Demographics
- Population: 0 (2001)

Trachilos (Greek: Τράχηλος, "neck"), also known as Trachila, is an uninhabited Greek islet, located south of cape Goudero on the coast of Lasithi, eastern Crete, in the Libyan Sea. It forms a close group of islands with Koufonisi, Makroulo, Marmaro, and Strongyli.

== See also ==
- List of islands of Greece
