= Egypt–Greece maritime deal =

Egypt-Greece maritime relationship

Egypt-Greece maritime deal
- Type: National boundary delimitation
- Signed: 6 August 2020
- Location: Cairo, Egypt
- Effective: 10 October 2020
- Signatories: Minister of Foreign Affairs of Egypt Sameh Shoukry; Minister for Foreign Affairs of Greece Nikos Dendias
- Parties: Egypt; Greece
- Depositaries: United Nations Secretariat
- Languages: Arabic, Greek, English

Egypt and Greece signed in summer 2020 a maritime treaty creating an exclusive economic zone for oil and gas drilling rights in the Mediterranean sea. The deal establishes “partial demarcation of the sea boundaries between the two countries, and that the remaining demarcation would be achieved through consultations.”

The Egyptian foreign minister Sameh Shoukry and his Greek counterpart Nikos Dendias signed the deal in Cairo on 6 August as a response to the 2019 Libya (GNA)–Turkey maritime deal. It was ratified by the Egyptian president Abdel-Fattah el-Sissi on October 10 and the Greek Parliament on August 27. On 2 September, the treaty was submitted to the United Nations Secretariat.

In March 2021, after Turkey expressed its will to make an agreement on maritime borders with Egypt, the latter discussed cooperation in Eastern Mediterranean with Greece and aimed for further coordination in other areas such as economic, military and security matters.

== Turkish response ==
Turkish President Recep Tayyip Erdogan called the Egypt-Greece deal “worthless", while the Turkish Ministry of Foreign Affairs made a press release stating: "A maritime boundary between Greece and Egypt does not exist. With respect to Turkey, the so-called maritime delimitation agreement signed today is null and void. This understanding will reflect on the ground and at the table."

Turkey is not a signatory to the UN Convention on the Law of the Sea, which defined the exclusive economic zone of Greece in 1982.

== See also ==
- Egypt–Greece relations
- Libya (GNA)–Turkey maritime deal
- East Mediterranean Gas Forum
