= Egypt–Greece relations =

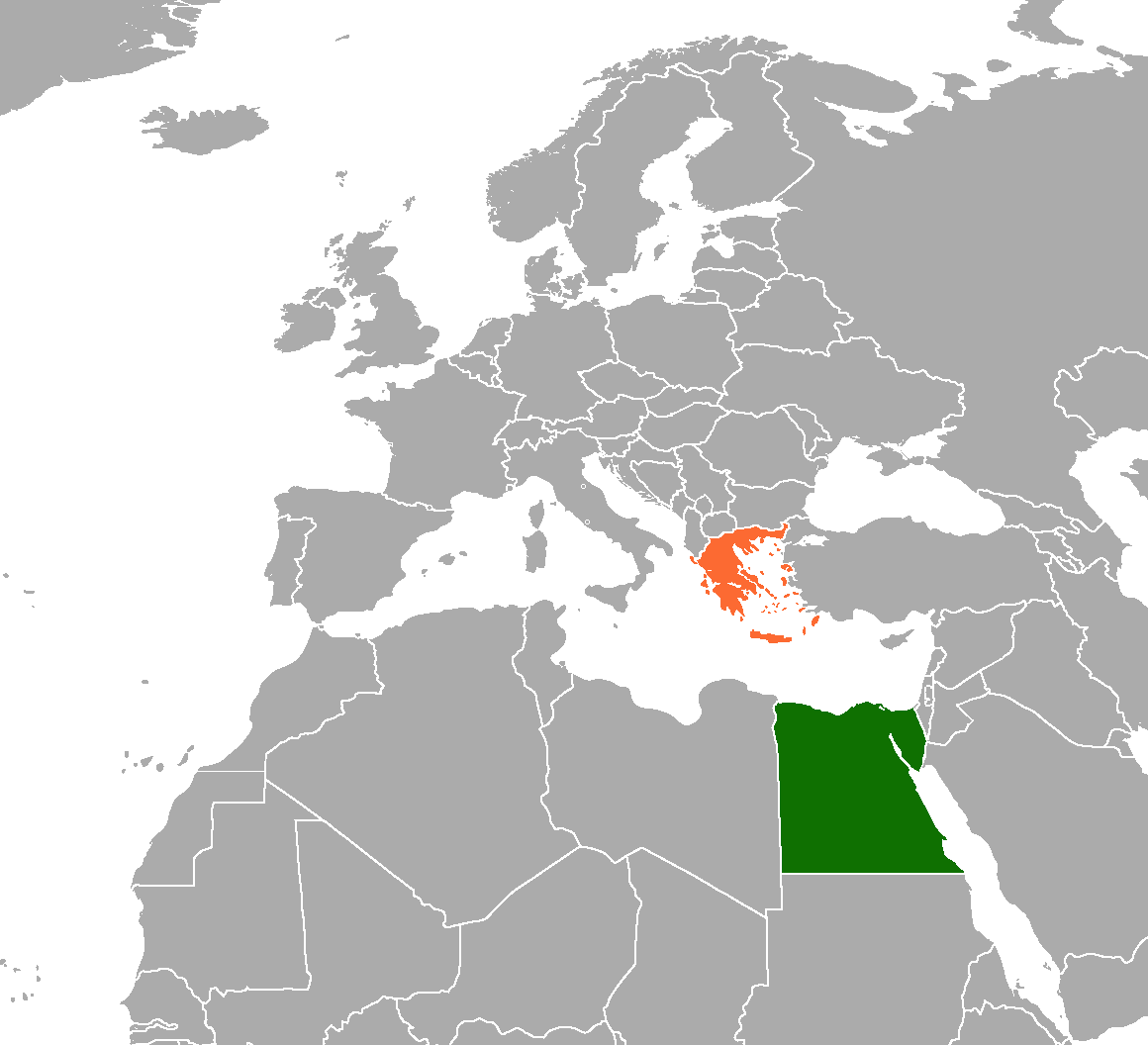
- Egypt: Greece

Diplomatic mission
- Embassy of Egypt, Athens: Embassy of Greece, Cairo

Egypt–Greece relations refer to bilateral relations between the Arab Republic of Egypt and the Hellenic Republic, due to the strong cultural and historical ties between the two nations, Egypt and Greece today enjoy friendly relations. Modern diplomatic relations between the two countries were established after Greece gained its independence in 1830, and are today regarded as cordial. Both countries are members and partners in several international organizations such as the IMF, OSCE, World Trade Organization, Union for the Mediterranean and the United Nations.

== History ==
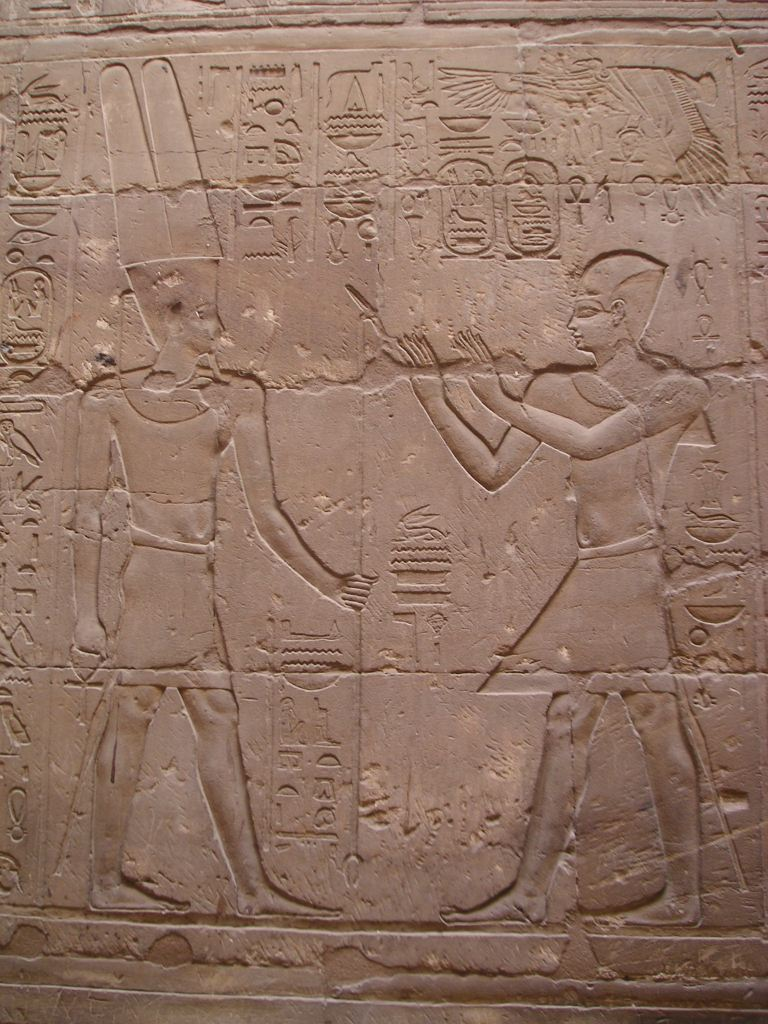
Alexander the Great as Pharaoh praying to the Egyptian god Amun

Due to the strong cultural and historical ties between the two nations, from ancient to modern times, especially since the creation of the city of Alexandria by the Macedonian king Alexander the Great, on the Eastern Mediterranean Sea's coast and the rich heritage further strengthened the bonds between the two nations, in addition to the Ptolemaic dynasty which ruled Egypt for 275 years, Egypt and Greece today enjoy warm diplomatic relations and consider each other on friendly terms. Egypt had also a Greek community, mostly centered in Alexandria, which is today Egypt's second largest city and also the seat of the Greek Orthodox Patriarchate of Alexandria.

In 1825, during the Greek War of Independence, Ibrahim Pasha of Egypt came to the assistance of the Ottomans and it was the Battle of Navarino and the Morea expedition that forced him to retreat. After 1830, the relations between the two countries improved. During the rise of Pan-Arab nationalism and the subsequent nationalisation of many industries in 1961 and 1963 by Gamal Abdel Nasser, most of the Greek community emigrated from Egypt for other countries, such as the United States, Canada, South Africa and Australia.

Relations now are described as strategic and are developing on all fronts, with several trade, tourism, economic and defense cooperation agreements signed by the governments and heads of states in their regular meetings. Greece is Egypt's 6th largest foreign investor.

In 2019, archaeologists reported that in two large tombs at Pylos, they found items, including a golden pendant depicting the head of the Egyptian goddess Hathor, which show that Pylos, had trading connections, previously unknown, with Egypt and the Near East around 1500 BC.

== Cooperation ==
The two states cooperate in the fields of trade, maritime, energy, culture and tourism, with Greece being the 4th largest European investor in Egypt, with over 208 Greek companies being active in the Egyptian market, while Egypt is Greece's 6th biggest trading partner.

== Tripartite summits ==
Greece and Egypt hold tripartite summits on an annual basis along with Cyprus, within the framework of tripartite cooperation mechanism that was agreed between the three Mediterranean countries in 2014. These summits aim at enhancing cooperation between the three countries in politics, military, security, trade, economy, energy, gas, electricity, tourism, transport, agriculture and environment, and follow up on projects being implemented within the cooperation mechanism framework. It, also, seeks to enhance the distinguished relations among the three countries. As of 2025, 10 such tripartite summits were held with the latest being at Cairo.

=== Notable summits ===
==== First tripartite summit in Cairo ====
Egyptian President Abdel Fattah el-Sisi, Cypriot President Nicos Anastasiades, and Greek Prime Minister Antonis Samaras held a tripartite summit in Cairo at 8 November 2014, where the leaders of the three countries tackled the ongoing issues in the region of Middle East and the East Mediterranean Sea, and the three heads of governments agreed to intensify the cooperation between the three countries in economy, security, tourism and energy, as well as defining the common maritime borders and the EEZ in the Mediterranean Sea.

In the Cairo Summit, the governments of Greece and Cyprus condemned the terrorist attacks in Egyptian territory and the Mount Sinai, expressed political support to the Egyptian government, and agreed on mutual support between the three countries in international organizations and forums, with Greece and Cyprus advocating Egypt's positions in the European Union.

El-Sisi, Anastasiades and Samaras agreed to further encourage the foreign investments to the Egyptian economy and infrastructure, which suffered by the uprisings of Arab Spring, and to participate in the 2015 Cairo Economic Conference.

==== Second tripartite summit in Nicosia ====
In less than half a year since the first tripartite Summit, a new high-level Summit was held at Nicosia, at 29 April 2015, between the heads of the governments of Cyprus, Egypt and Greece. In the Nicosia Summit, the Cypriot president Nicos Anastasiades, the Egyptian president Abdel Fattah el-Sisi and the Greek Prime Minister Alexis Tsipras, confirmed the will for bolstering further the cooperation between the three countries, and agreed on further cooperation in matters concerning the international organizations, as well as between the three countries. Among the matters discussed are the development of hydrocarbon reserves in Eastern Mediterranean, along the maritime border between both countries in their Exclusive Economic Zones.

== High level visits ==
Greek Vice-President and Minister of Foreign Affairs Evangelos Venizelos paid an official visit to Egypt on 5 September 2014, in an effort to bolster the relations between the two countries. In Cairo, Venizelos met with the government officials and discussed various matters of mutual interests, such as foreign investments to the country, trade, and shared opinions about the political situation in the Middle East, which concerns and affects both (Mediterranean) countries, as well tackling matters of mutual interest such as defining the EEZ boundaries between the two countries, and boosting further the cooperation between the two governments in international organizations and forums.

The president of Greece, Prokopis Pavlopoulos, paid an official visit to Egypt on 24 April 2015, in a bid for strengthening Greek-Egyptian relations, and intensifying the cooperation between the governments of the two countries, and tackle matters of mutual interest, such as the political situation in the Middle East and the illegal immigration which concerns both (Mediterranean) countries, as well as defining the maritime boundaries between the two countries.

== Resident diplomatic missions ==
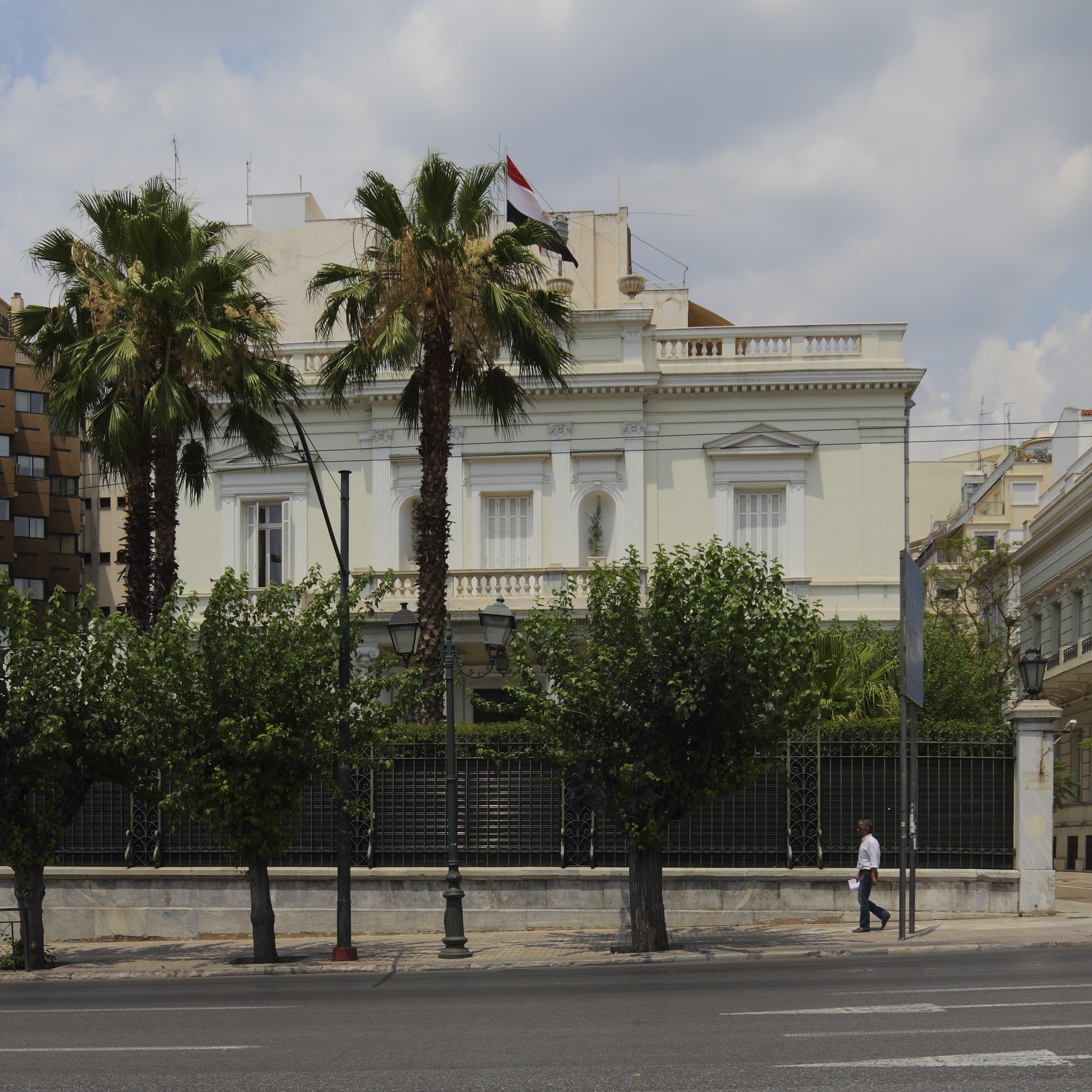
Embassy of Egypt in Athens

- Egypt has an embassy in Athens and a consulate-general in Thessaloniki.
- Greece has an embassy in Cairo and a consulate-general in Alexandria.

== 2020 maritime agreement ==
On 6 August 2020, Egypt and Greece signed an agreement on the exclusive economic zone (EEZ) of the two countries. The main reason for the countries' decision to sign the agreement was to cancel the internationally and heavily criticized Libya (GNA)–Turkey maritime deal but to also ease tensions in the Eastern Medditerenean. Turkey rapidly responded to the bilateral agreement, by calling it 'non-existent' because it goes against the agreement signed between Turkey and Libya's GNA. The agreement strengthened Egypt's and Greece's relation, something that both prime ministers mentioned. On 27 August, the Hellenic Parliament ratified the maritime accord with Egypt. Later on, the UN's Division for Ocean Affairs and the Law of the Sea published the agreement.

== 2021 military cooperation program ==
In April 2021, Greece, Cyprus and Egypt have signed a trilateral military cooperation program, in order to improve and upgrade military cooperation between these countries.

== See also ==
- Egyptian Greeks

== Sources ==
- Dalachanis, Angelos (2017). The Greek Exodus from Egypt: Diaspora Politics and Emigration 1937-1962. London: Berghann. ISBN 978-1-78533-447-4.
