= Koufonisi (Crete) =

Greek island in the Libyan Sea

Native name: Κουφονήσι
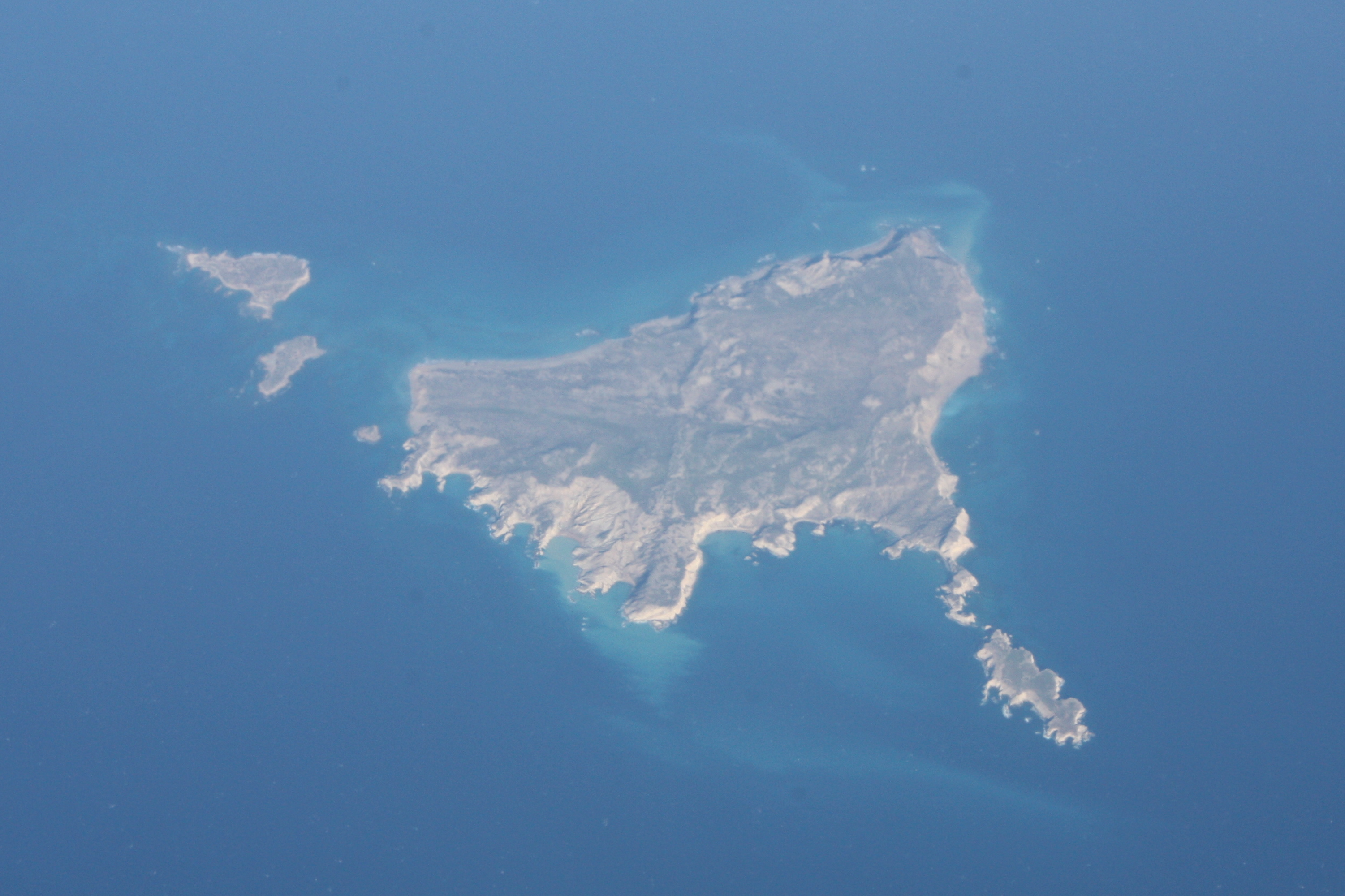
- Aerial photo of Koufonisi

- Location within Greece

Geography
- Coordinates: 34.937°N 26.139°E
- Archipelago: Cretan Islands
- Area: 5.25 km^{2} (2.03 sq mi)

Administration
- Greece
- Region: Crete
- Regional unit: Lasithi

Demographics
- Population: 0 (2001)

Koufonisi (Greek: Κουφονήσι, known as Leuce in antiquity) is an uninhabited Greek islet, located 5.6 km (3 nautical miles) south of cape Goudero on the coast of Lasithi, eastern Crete, in the Libyan Sea. The island is roughly 6 kilometres (4 miles) long and 5.5 kilometres (3.4 miles) across. It has an entire surface area of 5.25 square kilometres (2.03 sq mi). It forms a close group of islands with Makroulo, Marmaro, Strongyli, and Trachilos. During the summer, the island is visited by tour boats from the port of Makry Gialos approximately 18 km (11 miles) away.

== History ==
Ancient ruins cover the island and can be dated from the Minoan civilisation and the post-Byzantine era when some of the caves were used as chapels during Christian persecution by the Ottomans. Due to the wealth of archaeology the island has been described as "a little Delos".

=== Sponge fishing and purple dye ===
In ancient times Leuce was important for sponge fishing and for the production of a purple dye made from the gastropod Murex trunculus. The purple dye was a valuable commodity in ancient Greece and was worth its weight in solid silver.

=== Roman ruins ===
There are Roman ruins on the island including a theatre, that could seat 1,000 people, a temple, a villa with eight rooms, and a number of houses (probably the homes of fishermen). There are also remnants of the statue of a deity at the temple.

=== Greek War of Independence ===
In April 1823, 28 Cretan insurgents from the eastern part of Crete, under the chieftain Emmanouil Kozani, Emmanouil Alexi, and others boarded a small ship to go to Koufonisi at night where the notorious janissary Mehmet Pilavas and his 30 men were camped. The insurgents surrounded the janissaries and a gunfight ensued where Pilavas and 27 of his men were killed. Only three of the janissaries survived by hiding in crags in the rocks.

=== Lighthouse bombed during World War II ===
There are also the remains of a lighthouse that was bombed by the Germans during the Second World War.

== Important Bird Area ==
Koufonisi and its adjacent islets have been designated an Important Bird Area (IBA) by BirdLife International because they support a population of Eleonora's falcons.

== See also ==
- List of islands of Greece
