= Libya (GNA)–Turkey maritime deal =

Maritime boundary treaty between Libya and Turkey

Memorandum of Understanding between the Government of the Republic of Turkey and the Government of National Accord – State of Libya on delimitation of the maritime jurisdiction areas in the Mediterranean
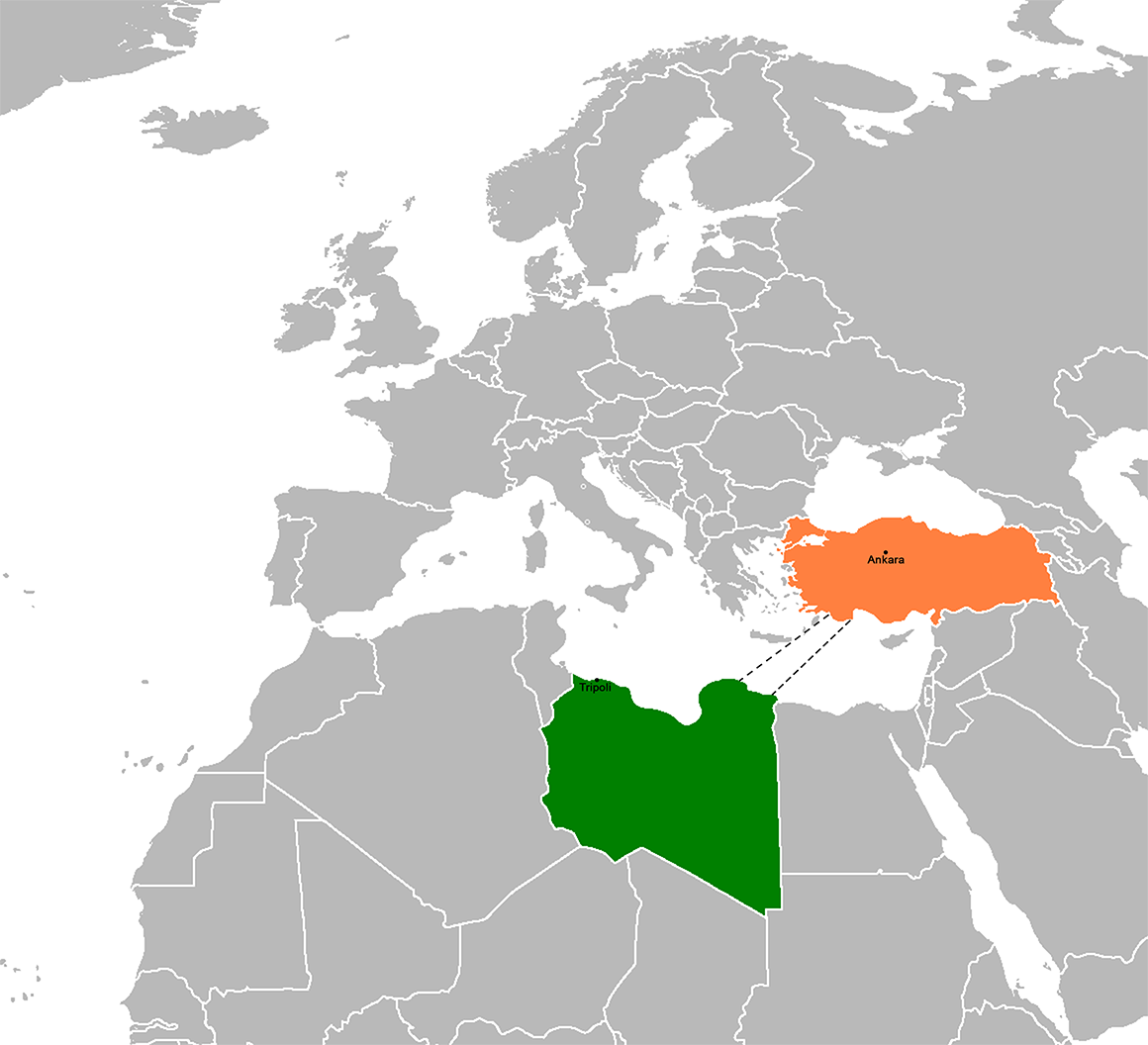
- Signed: 27 November 2019
- Location: Istanbul, Turkey
- Parties: Libya; Turkey
- Languages: Arabic; English; Turkish

Turkey and the Government of National Accord (GNA) of Libya signed a maritime boundary treaty (Note: Officially the Memorandum of Understanding between the Government of the Republic of Turkey and the Government of National Accord – State of Libya on delimitation of the maritime jurisdiction areas in the Mediterranean (Turkish: Türkiye Cumhuriyeti Hükümeti ile Libya Devleti Hükümeti Arasında Akdeniz'de Deniz Yetki Alanlarının Sınırlandırılmasına İlişkin Mutabakat Muhtırası).) in November 2019, in order to establish an exclusive economic zone in the Mediterranean Sea, which meant that they could claim rights to seabed resources. However, fears were expressed that the agreement may fuel an "energy showdown" in this region, because it was highly contentious.

The agreement was controversial and drew widespread condemnation by the states in the region and the international community, including the rival Tobruk-based government led by Libya's Parliament (House of Representatives) and the Libyan National Army, the European Union, Greece, Egypt, Cyprus, the United States of America, Russia, Malta, France, Germany, Italy, Serbia, Israel, Syria, Bahrain, Saudi Arabia, the United Arab Emirates and the Arab League, as a violation of the International Law of the Sea (UNCLOS) and the article 8 of the Skhirat Agreement which prohibits the Libyan Prime Minister from making international agreements without the unanimous consent of the cabinet members. The accord's legitimacy and the legal consequences have been disputed. According to the European Union, it "infringed upon the sovereign rights of third States, did not comply with the United Nations' Law of the Sea and could not produce any legal consequences for third states". Both Cyprus and Egypt had dismissed the deal as "illegal", while Greece regarded it as "void" and "geographically absurd", because it ignored the presence of the Greek islands of Crete, Kasos, Karpathos, Kastellorizo and Rhodes between the Turkish–Libyan coasts. Tunisia and Malta lodged official diplomatic protests against Libya's Government of National Unity, firmly rejecting the maritime map and coordinates submitted by Tripoli to the United Nations on the grounds that they violate international law and infringe upon their continental shelfs and Exclusive Economic Zones. Both countries have called for dialogue guided by international legal frameworks, including UNCLOS, to reach equitable resolutions. Italy later, in 2026, formally objected in an official Note Verbale submitted to the United Nations to those portions of Libya's claimed outer continental shelf that extend east of 15°10′E and west of 13°50′E, arguing that these areas may affect Italy's rights and interests under the law of the sea. Italy cited the 1985 ICJ Libya–Malta Continental Shelf judgment, arguing that the two meridians mark the limits beyond which the claims of third states, including Italy, may arise. Italy welcomed Libya's willingness to engage in maritime delimitation negotiations and maintained that any overlapping claims should be resolved through negotiation and in accordance with international law.

On 5 December 2019, the Turkish Parliament ratified the maritime deal, where it had a strong backing by four of Turkey's five major political parties – with the exception of the pro-Kurdish People's Democracy Party (HDP). The Libyan Parliament however blocked the ratification and rejected the deal unanimously, with the President of the Parliament, Aguila Saleh Issa, sending a letter to the United Nations declaring it as null and void. Even though the ratification by the Libyan Parliament failed, GNA deposited the maritime agreement to the United Nations on 27 December, with Turkey following on 2 March of the next year. On 14 July 2020, it is revealed that five countries sent a joint note verbale to the UN Secretariat calling for the agreement to not be registered and accepted, noting that, per UN procedures, its ratification by the Libyan Parliament is a prerequisite. On 1 October, the UN Secretary-General, Antonio Guterres, registered the Turkey-GNA deal on the delimitation of maritime jurisdiction areas in the Mediterranean. The agreement "has been registered with the Secretariat, in accordance with Article 102 of the Charter of the United Nations," said the certificate of registration. The retired Turkish admiral Cihat Yaycı clarified that the agreement being registered by the UN should not be perceived as an approval by the organization; this is actually a typical procedure, after member states have notified the UN of their agreements.

Nine months later, in August 2020, Greece and Egypt signed a maritime deal, demarcating an exclusive economic zone for oil and gas drilling rights, to counter the Turkey-GNA agreement.

The Turkish-GNA memorandum on maritime zones was cancelled by the Al-Bayda Court of Appeals of Libya in its 27 January 2021 ruling.

== Turkey and GNA's position ==
According to the Turkish Newspaper Daily Sabah, the new agreement consists of the establishment of 200 Nautical miles of EEZ, and an establishment of 18.6 nautical miles of Continental shelf. The Turkish position, according to Recep Tayyip Erdoğan is that it is protecting its sovereign rights to the Blue economy and defending their legal claims to the disputed territory in the Mediterranean. Also, according to Anadolu Agency, EEZ boundaries' legality in the Mediterranean should be determined by continental shelves and mainland countries, rather than island based calculations.

In Libya, the signing of the memorandum was met with varying responses: it was welcomed by the supporters of the Tripoli-based Government of National Accord, but rejected by the Tobruk-based government which is backed by the Libyan House of Representatives and Khalifa Haftar's Libyan National Army (LNA). Ahmad Al Mismari, the official spokesman of Haftar's forces, rejected the agreement and warned that “military force will be deployed to prevent any violation of Libyan sovereignty”. Members of the Libyan Parliament expressed similar sentiments, while its Speaker, Aguila Saleh Issa, sent a letter to UN Secretary-General, António Guterres, describing the deal as "null and void". Saleh argued that the agreement should be ratified by the Libyan Parliament, and that "Libya and Turkey do not have common maritime boundaries".

== International reactions ==
The United States of America stated that the deal was "provocative" and a threat to the stability of the region.

European Commission Vice President Josep Borrell stated that the agreement signed by Turkey and GNA creates an infringement for third states, and does not comply with the Law of the sea. The president of The Republic of Cyprus, Nicos Anastasiades aimed to create a diplomatic movement in order to nullify the GNA-Turkish agreement. He has also stated that this movement would not include military options. Greece lodged objections to the UN and expelled the Libyan ambassador in response to the deal, infuriated at a pact which skirts the Greek island of Crete and infringes its continental shelf.

Although the European Union has consistently voiced strong support for Greece and Cyprus, internal disagreements among member states over how to respond to an increasingly assertive Turkey have hindered the bloc from implementing broad sanctions or taking a more forceful stance.

In Germany, the German Federal Parliament (Bundestag)'s research service reviewed the Turkey-GNA maritime deal and found it to be illegal under international law, and detrimental to third parties.

Israel's acting foreign minister Israel Katz announced his country's opposition to the maritime border accord between Ankara and Tripoli, and claimed that the deal was "illegal". The Israeli perspective offered by the Jerusalem Center for Public Affairs also comments that the deal does not give sovereignty over the claimed waters to Turkey and Libya. Furthermore, it states that the third states were kept in the dark regarding the Libyan-Turkish agreement, hence leading to questions regarding its legitimacy.

In a Joint Declaration issued on 11 May 2020, Greece, Cyprus, Egypt joined by France and the United Arab Emirates, denounced the deal, arguing that it "cannot produce any legal consequences for third States", as it infringes upon the sovereign rights of Greece, and does not comply with the UN's Law of the Sea. Turkey called the Joint Statement hypocritical by "a group of countries who are seeking regional chaos and instability".

In August 2020, Egypt and Greece signed an agreement, designating an exclusive economic zone between the two countries. The announcement was made at a joint press conference with the Foreign Ministers of the two countries, stating inter-alliance that the deal established a partial demarcation of the sea boundaries between the two countries and that the remaining demarcation would be achieved through consultations. The parliaments of the two countries ratified the agreement swiftly, and in October 2020 Egyptian President Abdel Fattah el-Sisi signed the deal, which was then published by the official gazette of the country. Turkey dismissed the Greece – Egypt deal as “null and void”, adding Greece and Egypt have no mutual sea border.

== Consequences ==
Following the agreement, Turkey and Libya's UN-recognized government had seen an increase in co-operation. This cooperation ranges from Turkish offshore exploration efforts to providing aid for the Government of National Accord for the Libyan Civil War (2014–2020). As the issues arising due to the dispute are still developing, the full consequences of this maritime dispute are yet to be seen.

A maritime deal between Egypt and Greece has been signed in response.

On 19 May 2023, Claudio Descalzi, the CEO of Italian energy company Eni, said that any agreement for the construction of the EastMed pipeline must include Turkey; he added that "there are disputes between Turkey and Cyprus that are difficult to remedy, furthermore Turkey has made an agreement with Libya to define a very vast platform that covers almost the entire EastMed, therefore not only Turkey but also Libya will have a say." In response to these comments, George Papanastasiou, the Cypriot Minister of Energy, Commerce and Industry, stated that not all people agree with the opinions expressed by Descalzi, and that he respects his opinion. These remarks follow reports that Eni, Cyprus and Israel are working on a deal for constructing a natural gas pipeline in the Eastern Mediterranean, connecting both the Cypriot and Israeli offshore gas fields to a processing plant in Cyprus, where the gas will be liquefied for export by ship to Italy and the rest of Europe.

== Cancellation by House of Representatives ==
The maritime deal was canceled by the Al-Bayda Court of Appeals of Libya in its 27 January 2021 ruling. The court ruled in favor of the Libyan House of Representatives which filed a lawsuit to declare the Memorandum as invalid. According to Turkish researcher Şafak Yıldırım, the agreement cannot be cancelled unilaterally due to the principle of parallelism in authority and procedure. Unlike Turkey, Libya is a signatory to the UN Convention on the Law of the Sea, which defined the exclusive economic zone of Greece in 1982; though, it has not ratified it.

== 2022 preliminary energy exploration deal ==
In October 2022, Turkey and the Government of National Unity (Libya) (GNU) signed a preliminary energy exploration deal based on the previous deal. Greece and Egypt warned that they would oppose any activity in disputed areas, while the House of Representatives rejected the deal and said that it was signed by a government which doesn't have a mandate.

The European Union said that the details of the new agreement are not known yet and couldn't make a statement on that deal, but reminded that the previous agreement "does not comply with the Law of the Sea and cannot produce any legal consequences for third states".

On 9 January 2023, a Libyan court in Tripoli suspended the deal. The Turkish Foreign Minister said that the Libya's Government of National Unity (GNU) backs the deal despite the court suspension and that GNU told him "not to take seriously" the court ruling. The Libyan General Bar Association agreed with the court ruling.

On 19 February 2024, the Court of Appeal in Tripoli ruled to cancel the agreement.

== 2025 shift in Haftar–Turkey relations and subsequent events ==
At the end of 2024, Turkey reopened its consulate in Benghazi. In January 2025, Turkey resumed direct flights to Benghazi via its national flag carrier, the Turkish Airlines, and later to Misrata, making it the airline's third Libyan destination after Tripoli and Benghazi. The inaugural Misrata flight ceremony was attended by Turkish Ambassador Guven Begec, Libyan Transport Minister Muhammad Al-Shahoubi, Turkish Airlines Sales President Mahmut Yayla, and other officials. On 23 January, Tunisia sent a formal letter to the UN opposing Libya's maritime zone declaration, claiming it violates the UNCLOS and asked to negotiate a mutually acceptable boundary.

In April 2025, Saddam Haftar visited Ankara to seek Turkish support, meeting high-ranking Turkish officials, including Defense Minister Yasar Guler, he had previously traveled to Qatar for similar talks. Turkish construction firms expanded in eastern Libya, signing contracts with the Libya Development and Reconstruction Fund, led by Belgassim Haftar, for projects in Benghazi, Al-Bayda, Shahhat and Tobruk. By June, Libya's eastern parliament aligned with Haftar considered ratifying the Turkey maritime agreement, a move viewed as courting Ankara while undermining Tripoli's Government of National Unity.

In late June 2025, Libya's National Oil Corporation (NOC) signed a memorandum of understanding with Turkey's state-owned oil company TPAO to conduct offshore geological and geophysical surveys, prompting protests from Greece, the EU, Malta, and Egypt.

In July, Libya formally opposed Greece's claims to maritime zones south and west of Crete, rejecting the median line proposed by Greece and calling on the UN and international community to ensure stability. During IDEF 2025 in Istanbul, an annual defense fair held in the city, Turkish Defense Minister, Chief of the General Staff, and Commander of the Land Forces met Saddam Haftar, Turkish military intelligence also met Major General Mahmoud Hamza of the western Libyan Army.

Migration from Libya to Greece surged by approximately 173% and an EU diplomat indicated that Libya might be attempting to weaponize migration in coordination with Turkey to pursue shared political objectives. The EU sought to manage the surge by cooperating with Benghazi authorities on migration, but Haftar expelled the delegation, triggering a crisis within the EU. In response, Greece deployed warships to patrol the border with Libya, introduced stricter migration regulations and began training Libyan Coast Guard personnel from both eastern and western Libya. In August, Turkey, Italy and Libya held talks in Istanbul on migration and other areas of cooperation, agreeing to reconvene later to assess the outcomes of their committees.

In August 2025, the Turkish Navy corvette TCG Kınalıada docked in Benghazi as part of a Turkish Naval Forces tour of Libyan ports, following an earlier stop in Tripoli. In Tripoli, the vessel was received by Libyan Army Chief of Staff Mohammed Al-Haddad, and Turkish–Libyan naval units, including the Turkish TCB-59 helicopter, conducted joint maritime drills. Turkish officials discussed expanding military cooperation, particularly in naval, air and air defense training with the Libyan Army Chief of Staff.

The Benghazi visit included a high-level delegation led by Turkish Ambassador Guven Begec, Defense Ministry Director-General Lt. Gen. Ilkay Altindag, Consul General Serkan Keramanlioglu, Rear Admirals Refik Levent Tezcan and Huseyin Tigli, and Navy Captain Ilkay Beril Aydemir. They were received by Saddam Khalifa. Talks focused on strengthening military and naval cooperation and exchanging technical expertise, including discussion of the “One Libya, One Army” initiative. Saddam Khalifa toured the warship afterward. TCG Kınalıada had previously visited Alexandria in August 2024, symbolizing improved Turkish–Egyptian ties.

Shortly after the Benghazi visit, Turkish intelligence chief Ibrahim Kalin met Khalifa Haftar, Saddam Haftar, and Belgassim Haftar in Benghazi, inviting Khalifa Haftar to Turkey; Haftar accepted for a planned September visit. A high-level Turkish delegation, led by the head of the Turkish Intelligence Agency also met the Board of the University of Benghazi. Turkey signaled it was considering deploying military advisers and trainers to eastern Libya.

On 18 August, Malta formally protested Libya's maritime map submitted to the UN, arguing it violated international law and encroached on Malta's continental shelf and EEZ, and called for dialogue under UNCLOS.

By late August, sources reported that Libya's eastern parliament was preparing to vote on the maritime deal. If approved, the deal would reinforce Turkey's challenge to what it calls a Greek-imposed blockade enforced by the Greek islands. It would also provide legal and political justification for expanded Turkish gas exploration in disputed waters and support a sustained naval presence in the central Mediterranean. For eastern Libya, the agreement could offer investment opportunities and increased political leverage.

The European Union reiterated its opposition in June and September 2025, stating the deal violates international law and third states sovereign rights and has no legal effect and urged compliance with UNCLOS and dialogue.

In early September 2025, the head of the Egyptian General Intelligence Service, held a meeting with the Director of Turkey's National Intelligence Organization. Their discussions focused on regional and international issues, with particular attention to the situations in Gaza, Sudan, and Libya. Also in early September, during the Gastech 2025 conference in Milan, the premier forum for natural gas, LNG, hydrogen, climate technologies, and artificial intelligence, the Turkish Energy Minister Alparslan Bayraktar had a meeting with Libya's Oil and Gas Minister Khalifa Abdulsadek. Both ministers expressed mutual interest in expanding joint projects and investment opportunities in the energy sector. Furthermore, Saddam Khalifa Haftar met in Rome with Ibrahim Dbeibah, a key adviser to Tripoli-based Prime Minister Abdulhamid Dbeibah, along with U.S. presidential adviser Massad Boulos. Their discussions focused on a wide range of issues, including security, military affairs, politics, and energy. In addition, the Turkish Foreign Minister Hakan Fidan visited Italy to meet with his Italian counterpart, Antonio Tajani, for talks focused on energy security, Mediterranean connectivity, irregular migration (particularly from Libya), defense industry collaboration, science and technology, and key regional issues, including Libya. Fidan emphasized that Turkey has played a crucial role in reducing migration flows from Libya, and both countries signed a deal to deepen cooperation between their coast guards and law enforcement agencies to combat irregular migration in the Mediterranean and jointly work toward ensuring Libya's stability. In the same period, the Libya Development and Reconstruction Fund, based in eastern Libya, announced it had signed memorandums of understanding with the Italian company GKSD S.r.L. The agreements cover cooperation in health, infrastructure, clean energy, and environmental sectors. The signing took place during a meeting between the Fund's Director General, Belgassim Khalifa Haftar, and the head of the Italian Intelligence Service, who led a high-level Italian delegation. The President of GKSD S.r.L. was also present. Meanwhile in Greece, according to the Greek newspaper Kathimerini, Belgassim Haftar also visited Athens to discuss enhancing cooperation in the areas of construction, energy, investment, and transport. The visit also coincided with preparations for an upcoming Greek trade mission to Benghazi in the fall. During the talks, both sides highlighted the historic relations between Greece and Libya, and expressed a shared desire to strengthen and build a genuine dialogue. They also agreed to continue training Libyan coast guard officers in Greece, and Belgassim Haftar reportedly assured that the House of Representatives would not ratify the maritime memorandum. The Greek Foreign Minister also expressed satisfaction with the significant decline in migrant flows from Tobruk to Crete. In addition, Chevron Corporation, in partnership with HelleniQ Energy, submitted a binding offer in Greece for four offshore blocks, some of which lie close to the median line that Greece claims as the boundary of its Exclusive Economic Zone. Greek officials consider Chevron's move a strong signal of trust, and they believe that if Chevron later pursues Libyan offshore blocks located south of Greece's claimed EEZ boundary, it could result in a de facto maritime delimitation, even in the absence of formal treaties. Around the same time, during an official visit to Malta, the Government of National Unity of Libya and the Government of Malta reached an agreement to initiate discussions on maritime border issues. The talks, held between Libya's Acting Minister of Foreign Affairs, Al-Taher Al-Baour, and Maltese Foreign Minister Ian Borg, focused on resolving maritime boundaries through bilateral dialogue, with the possibility of expanding to multilateral talks if other countries become involved. Additional key topics included political developments in Libya, illegal migration, joint border management, coordination between coast guards, and development initiatives aimed at addressing the root causes of migration. In addition, Turkey began training Haftar's forces, with the Turkish Ministry of Defense releasing a video showcasing the training.

In mid-September 2025, Turkish President Recep Tayyip Erdogan revealed that Saddam Haftar, the son of Khalifa Haftar, has been in regular contact with Turkish intelligence and the foreign ministry. Erdogan noted that this engagement reflects Turkey's recent shift toward a more multi-dimensional diplomatic approach in Libya. He expressed strong expectations that the Benghazi-based authorities could soon ratify the 2019 maritime delimitation agreement. According to Erdogan, such a move would be a significant step toward promoting peace and securing Libya's place in the international legal order. In addition, during a joint Turkish–Libyan working group meeting in Ankara, Turkish Trade Minister Omer Bolat announced that Turkey has proposed holding the Turkish–Libyan Joint Economic Commission meeting in December, the first time since 2009. He emphasized the strong potential for expanded cooperation between the two countries in several key sectors, including natural resources and renewable energy. He also revealed that Turkey has begun implementing a long-term, multiple-entry visa system for Libyan citizens.

On 21 September, Greek Prime Minister Kyriakos Mitsotakis announced that technical discussions on maritime delimitation with Libya have officially begun. A Libyan delegation visited Athens, and the next round of talks is scheduled to take place in Tripoli. According to analysts, this diplomatic engagement marks a shift toward greater responsibility by both countries. By choosing dialogue over confrontation, Greece and Libya may have opened the door to a long and complex negotiation process, which is seen as essential for maintaining regional stability and preventing direct conflict. However, expectations for concrete outcomes remain low, as Turkey continues to be a dominant force in the region. The recent deal between Greece and Chevron is widely seen as an effort by Greece to position itself, not Turkey, as Libya's legitimate maritime partner. Yet in reality, Turkey remains a central player. Turkey considers its agreement with Libya untouchable, and with Libya lacking both a unified political front and the will in Tripoli to annul the MoU, the deal remains in effect although Greece deems it "illegal". Turkey's entrenched influence in western Libya continues to undermine Greek efforts, severely limiting Athens ability to shift the status quo. For its part, Libya is attempting to balance its relationships with both Greece and Turkey, leveraging the dynamic to attract diplomatic attention, investment opportunities, and bargaining power in negotiations over migration with Europe. However, this balancing act carries significant risks, it could deepen internal divisions within Libya or provoke backlash from groups loyal to Turkey.

In October 2025, Greece introduced a proposal for a regional cooperation framework involving Libya, Egypt, Cyprus, and Turkey. The plan suggests a multilateral "5×5" approach, where five countries would work together on five key areas: migration, marine environmental protection, connectivity, maritime zone delimitation, and civil protection. Greece aims for this framework to evolve into a permanent regional mechanism. In late October, Khaled Haftar visited Greece, where he met with the Greek Defense Minister and the Chief of the Greek National Defense General Staff. Around the same time, Turkey's Defense Ministry released videos showing the Turkish military training General Haftar's forces. Greek media reported that during his visit to Athens, Haftar demanded €1 billion annually from Greece in exchange for his support. Athens firmly rejected the request as blackmail and instead aims to maintain balanced ties with all Libyan parties to strengthen its regional influence.

In February 2026, the Turkish national energy company Turkish Petroleum (TPAO) signed a memorandum of understanding with BP for collaboration in Iraq and Libya. At the same time, Turkey's head of intelligence met with the Libyan prime minister in Tripoli to discuss matters of mutual interest. In August 2025, he held a separate meeting with General Khalifa Haftar in Benghazi. In the same month (February), Turkey stated that Greece's cooperation with Chevron off Crete violates international law and good neighbourly relations, while Greece responded that its actions were in accordance with international law.

=== Perspectives of analysts during this period ===
Turkey's expanding role in Libya is driven by a calculated effort to exploit shifting geopolitical conditions, particularly Russia's distraction in Ukraine and the U.S. and U.K. focus on energy security in the Middle East and North Africa.

Ankara's engagement with eastern Libya and rapprochement with Egypt represent a strategic pivot designed to reshape the Eastern Mediterranean balance of power, with implications extending beyond Libya to Gaza, Lebanon, and Israel.

Turkey’s policy shift has eroded trust on both sides of Libya's divide, alienating former allies in Tripoli while legitimizing Haftar's eastern authorities. This shift reveals that Ankara now prioritizes economic access and maritime leverage, positioning itself as an indispensable actor in the Libyan conflict and ensuring it cannot be excluded from any future settlement.

At the center of Turkey's Libya strategy is the preservation and expansion of the Turkish–Libya maritime agreement, which underpins the "Blue Homeland" doctrine and enables Ankara to challenge Greece and Cyprus.

By courting Haftar through arms sales and military cooperation, Turkey is positioning itself as a dominant external power broker in Libya's fragmented security sector, ensuring long-term leverage regardless of which Libyan faction prevails.

Turkey's growing influence in Africa, particularly in Libya's energy and defense sectors, has increased its strategic value to the U.S. and Europe, which increasingly view Ankara as a useful partner for countering Russian and Chinese influence despite ongoing regional frictions.

Coordination among Turkey, Italy, and the United States reflects a shared willingness to trade political consistency for short-term stability, prioritizing economic engagement and migration control over meaningful Libyan reconciliation.

As western Libya remains fragmented and UN mediation falters, Ankara increasingly regards Haftar as the most reliable vehicle for safeguarding its interests, making a Turkish-LNA alignment not only plausible but strategically attractive.

Turkey's 2026 decision to extend its military presence in Libya confirms a shift from intervention to entrenchment, locking in Ankara's role as a permanent Mediterranean power with operational reach into North Africa while deepening Libya's transformation into a theater of sustained proxy competition.

== 2026 signing ==
On 20 October 2026, Turkey and Libya's eastern-based House of Representatives unanimously approved the signing of the agreement. By this, they reversed their previous objection for the signing. Even though Turkey welcomed the agreement, the European Union, Greece, and Egypt opposed it, under the claim it violates the law of the sea, and therefore does not bind third party states to its legal consequences. The EU expressed its regret over the ratification of the agreement in question and reaffirmed its full solidarity with Greece and Cyprus.

== See also ==
- Aegean dispute
- Cyprus–Turkey maritime zones dispute
- Mediterranean Basin

== Sources ==
- The document sent to the UN by Turkey and GNA: Memorandum of Understanding between the Government of the Republic of Turkey and the Government of National Accord – State of Libya on delimitation of the maritime jurisdiction areas in the Mediterranean
