= Chrysi (island) =

Uninhabited Greek island

Chrissi
Native name: Χρυσή
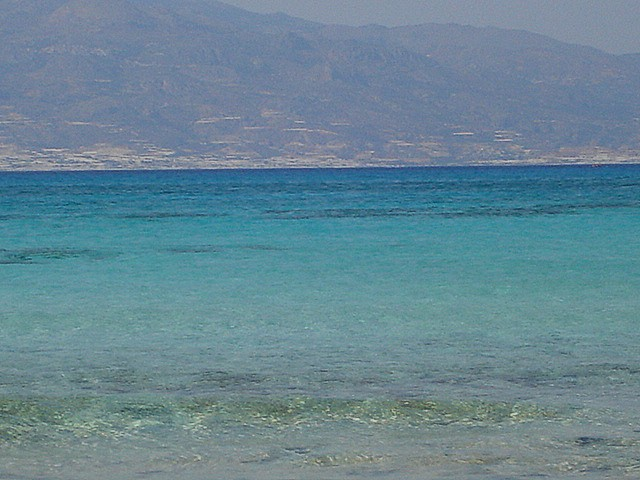
- A view of Crete from the island of Chrysi

- Location within Greece

Geography
- Coordinates: 34.87°N 25.71°E
- Archipelago: Cretan Islands
- Highest point: 31

Administration
- Greece
- Region: Crete
- Regional unit: Lasithi

Demographics
- Population: 3 (2017)

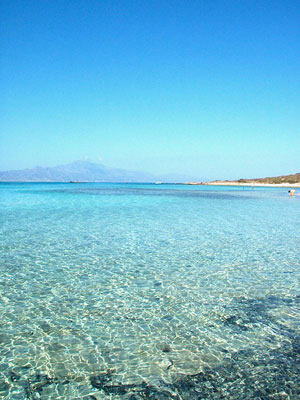
Golden coast

Chrysi or Chrisi (Greek: Χρυσή, romanized: Chrysí, lit. 'golden'; also known as Gaidouronisi, Greek: Γαϊδουρονήσι, romanized: Gaïdouronísi, lit. 'donkey island') is an uninhabited Greek island approximately 15 kilometres (9 miles) south of Crete close to Ierapetra in the Libyan Sea. Approximately 700 metres (2,300 feet) east of the island is the island of Mikronisi. Administratively these islands fall within the Ierapetra municipality in Lasithi.

It contains a small harbour and church, the Church of Saint Nicholas, on its northwestern coast.

== Tourism ==
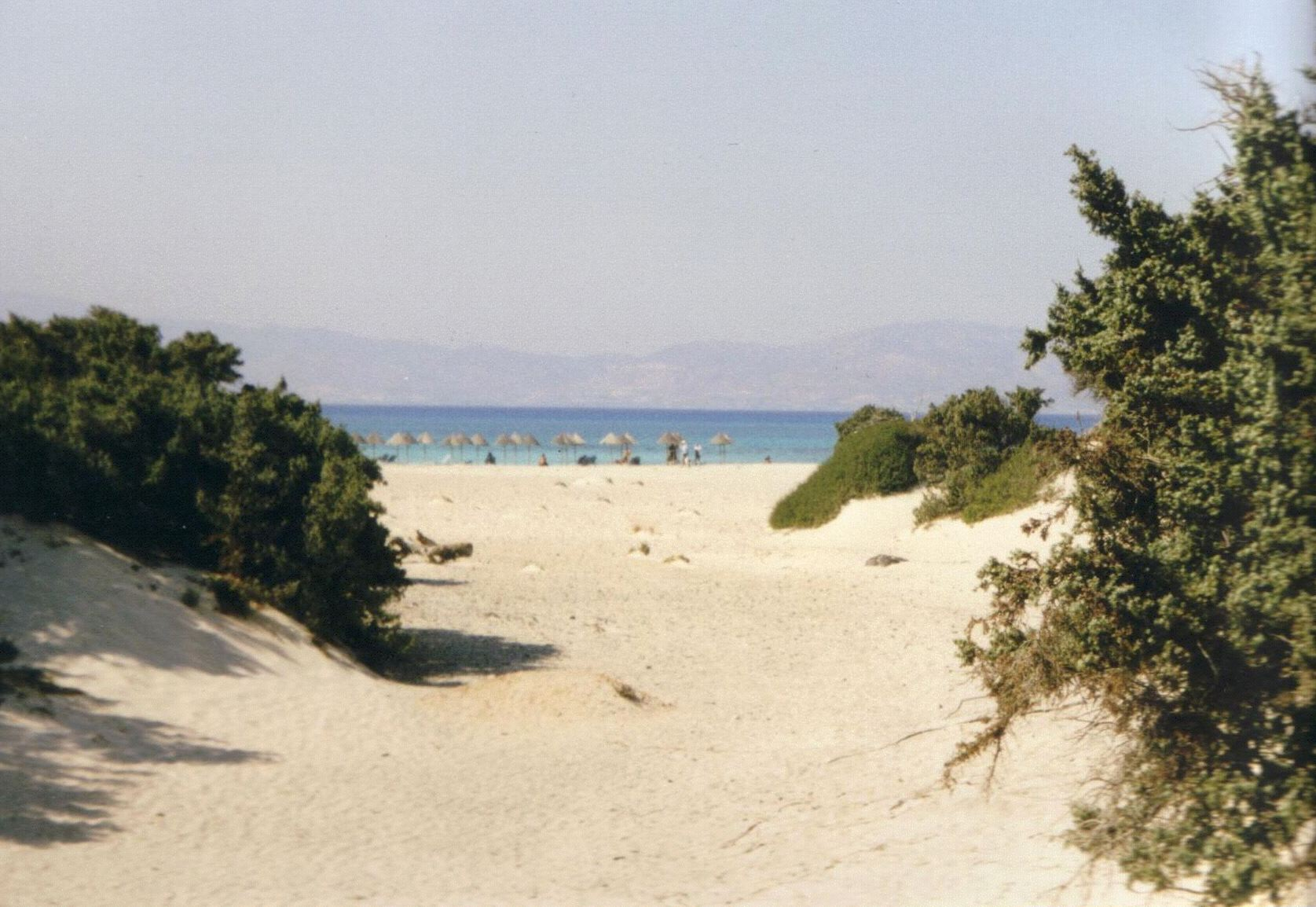
Chrysi beach

It is possible to visit Chrissi by sea from Ierapetra and from Myrtos. There is a nudist beach on the north coast of the island. The highest point on the island is called Kefala ("Head") and it is 31 metres (102 feet) above sea level. On the western part of the island is the chapel of Saint Nicholas (estimated to date to the 13th century). There are also a salt pan, an old port, some Minoan ruins, a lighthouse and a Roman cemetery. Owing to the shallow waters around Chrissi, snorkelling and diving are popular pastimes. The Belegrina, Hatzivolakas, and Kataprosopo bays have a wide diversity of shells.

It is possible to reach the island from Ierapetra between middle of May and late October. During the summer months, excursion boats from Ierapetra leave the quay every morning and return in the afternoon.

== Environmental protection ==
Chrissi is protected as an "area of intense natural beauty". The island has the largest naturally formed Juniperus macrocarpa forest in Europe. There is no fresh drinking water on the island. The majority of trees have an average age of 200 years and average height of up to 7 metres (23 feet), some of the trees are up to 300 years old and 10 metres (33 feet) tall. The density is approximately 28 trees per hectare (69.16/acre).

== Archaeology ==
Archaeologists excavated a Minoan settlement dating to between 1800 and 1500 B.C. At the settlement they also found purple dye workshops and many artifacts.

== See also ==
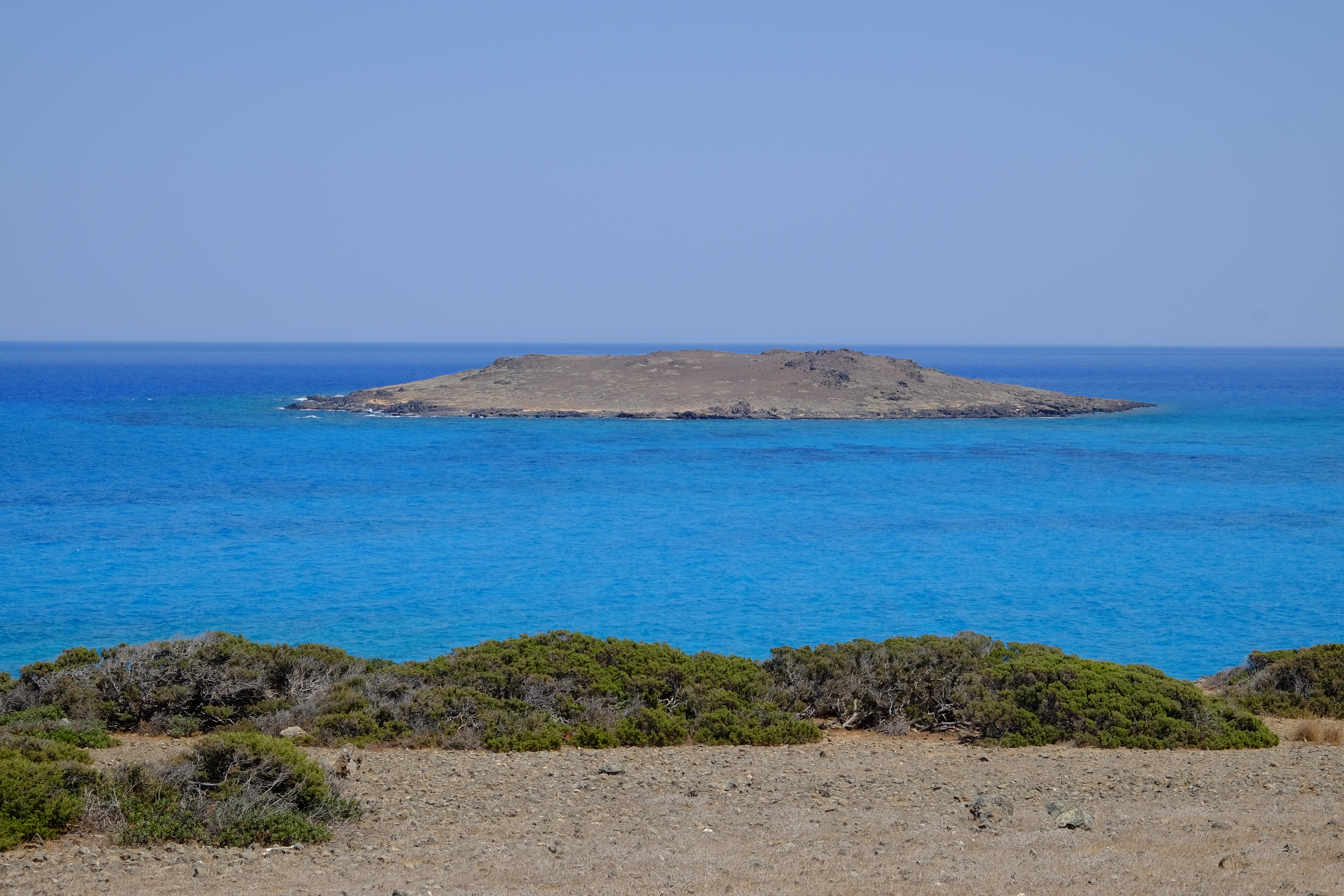
The small island of Mikronisi, seen from the highest point of Chrysi

- List of islands of Greece
