= List of parties to the United Nations Convention on the Law of the Sea =

Parties Parties, dually represented by the European Union Non-parties that are signatories Non-parties that are not signatories

The United Nations Convention on the Law of the Sea (UNCLOS) is the international agreement that resulted from the third United Nations Conference on the Law of the Sea (UNCLOS III), which took place between 1973 and 1982. The Convention was opened for signature on 10 December 1982 and entered into force on 16 November 1994 upon deposition of the 60th instrument of ratification.

The Convention has been ratified by 172 parties, which includes 171 states (168 United Nations member states plus the UN Observer state Palestine and non-member states the Cook Islands and Niue) and the European Union. An additional 12 UN member states have signed, but not ratified the Convention.

Subsequently, the "Agreement relating to the implementation of Part XI of the United Nations Convention on the Law of the Sea" was signed in 1994, effectively amending the original Convention. The Agreement has been ratified by 154 parties (all of which are parties to the Convention), which includes 153 states (150 United Nations member states plus the UN Observer state Palestine, as well as the Cook Islands and Niue) and the European Union. An additional three UN member states (Egypt, Sudan, USA) have signed, but not ratified the Agreement.

As per Article 4 of the Agreement, following adoption of the Agreement any state which ratifies the Convention also becomes a party to the Agreement. Additionally, only states which have previously established or establishes at the same time its consent to be bound by the Convention can become parties to the Agreement.

== List of parties ==
States with a dagger (†) are landlocked states.

State	Convention			Agreement		
State	Signed	Deposited	Method	Signed	Deposited	Method
Albania		Jun 23, 2003	Accession		Jun 23, 2003	Accession
Algeria	Dec 10, 1982	Jun 11, 1996	Ratification	Jul 29, 1994	Jun 11, 1996	Ratification
Angola	Dec 10, 1982	Dec 5, 1990	Ratification		Sep 7, 2010	Accession
Antigua and Barbuda	Feb 7, 1983	Feb 2, 1989	Ratification		May 3, 2016	Accession
Argentina	Oct 5, 1984	Dec 1, 1995	Ratification	Jul 29, 1994	Dec 1, 1995	Ratification
Armenia †		Dec 9, 2002	Accession		Dec 9, 2002	Accession
Australia	Dec 10, 1982	Oct 5, 1994	Ratification	Jul 29, 1994	Oct 5, 1994	Ratification
Austria †	Dec 10, 1982	Jul 14, 1995	Ratification	Jul 29, 1994	Jul 14, 1995	Ratification
Azerbaijan †		Jun 16, 2016	Accession		Jun 16, 2016	Accession
Bahamas	Dec 10, 1982	Jul 29, 1983	Ratification	Jul 29, 1994	Jul 28, 1995	Ratification
Bahrain	Dec 10, 1982	May 30, 1985	Ratification			
Bangladesh	Dec 10, 1982	Jul 27, 2001	Ratification		Jul 27, 2001	Accession
Barbados	Dec 10, 1982	Oct 12, 1993	Ratification	Nov 15, 1994	Jul 28, 1995	Ratification
Belarus †	Dec 10, 1982	Aug 30, 2006	Ratification		Aug 30, 2006	Accession
Belgium	Dec 5, 1984	Nov 13, 1998	Ratification	Jul 29, 1994	Nov 13, 1998	Ratification
Belize	Dec 10, 1982	Aug 13, 1983	Ratification		Oct 21, 1994	Accession
Benin	Aug 30, 1983	Oct 16, 1997	Ratification		Oct 16, 1997	Accession
Bolivia †	Nov 27, 1984	Apr 28, 1995	Ratification		Apr 28, 1995	Accession
Bosnia and Herzegovina		Jan 12, 1994	Succession from Socialist Federal Republic of Yugoslavia		May 26, 2021	Accession
Botswana †	Dec 5, 1984	May 2, 1990	Ratification		Jan 31, 2005	Accession
Brazil	Dec 10, 1982	Dec 22, 1988	Ratification	Jul 29, 1994	Oct 25, 2007	Ratification
Brunei	Dec 5, 1984	Nov 5, 1996	Ratification		Nov 5, 1996	Accession
Bulgaria	Dec 10, 1982	May 15, 1996	Ratification		May 15, 1996	Accession
Burkina Faso	Dec 10, 1982	Jan 25, 2005	Ratification	Nov 30, 1994	Jan 25, 2005	Ratification
Cabo Verde	Dec 10, 1982	Aug 10, 1987	Ratification	Jul 29, 1994	Apr 23, 2008	Ratification
Cambodia	Jul 1, 1983	Feb 6, 2026	Ratification		Feb 6, 2026	Accession
Cameroon	Dec 10, 1982	Nov 19, 1985	Ratification	May 24, 1995	Aug 28, 2002	Ratification
Canada	Dec 10, 1982	Nov 7, 2003	Ratification	Jul 29, 1994	Nov 7, 2003	Ratification
Chad †	Dec 10, 1982	Aug 14, 2009	Ratification		Aug 14, 2009	Accession
Chile	Dec 10, 1982	Aug 25, 1997	Ratification		Aug 25, 1997	Accession
China	Dec 10, 1982	Jun 7, 1996	Ratification	Jul 29, 1994	Jun 7, 1996	Ratification
Comoros	Dec 6, 1984	Jun 21, 1994	Ratification			
Democratic Republic of the Congo	Aug 22, 1983	Feb 17, 1989	Ratification			
Republic of the Congo	Dec 10, 1982	Jul 9, 2008	Ratification		Jul 9, 2008	Accession
Cook Islands	Dec 10, 1982	Feb 15, 1995	Ratification		Feb 15, 1995	Accession
Costa Rica	Dec 10, 1982	Sep 21, 1992	Ratification		Sep 20, 2001	Accession
Côte d'Ivoire	Dec 10, 1982	Mar 26, 1984	Ratification	Nov 25, 1994	Jul 28, 1995	Ratification
Croatia		Apr 5, 1995	Succession from Socialist Federal Republic of Yugoslavia		Apr 5, 1995	Accession
Cuba	Dec 10, 1982	Aug 15, 1984	Ratification		Oct 17, 2002	Accession
Cyprus	Dec 10, 1982	Dec 12, 1988	Ratification	Nov 1, 1994	Jul 27, 1995	Ratification
Czech Republic †	Feb 22, 1993	Jun 21, 1996	Ratification; Succession to the signature of Czechoslovakia †	Nov 16, 1994	Jun 21, 1996	Ratification
Denmark	Dec 10, 1982	Nov 16, 2004	Ratification	Jul 29, 1994	Nov 16, 2004	Ratification
Djibouti	Dec 10, 1982	Oct 8, 1991	Ratification			
Dominica	Mar 28, 1983	Oct 24, 1991	Ratification			
Dominican Republic	Dec 10, 1982	Jul 10, 2009	Ratification		Jul 10, 2009	Accession
Ecuador		Sep 24, 2012	Accession		Sep 24, 2012	Accession
Egypt	Dec 10, 1982	Aug 26, 1983	Ratification	Mar 22, 1995		
Equatorial Guinea	Jan 30, 1984	Jul 21, 1997	Ratification		Jul 21, 1997	Accession
Estonia		Aug 26, 2005	Accession		Aug 26, 2005	Accession
Eswatini †	Jan 18, 1984	Sep 24, 2012	Ratification	Oct 12, 1994	Sep 24, 2012	Ratification
European Union	Dec 7, 1984	Apr 1, 1998	Ratification	Jul 29, 1994	Apr 1, 1998	Ratification
Fiji	Dec 10, 1982	Dec 10, 1982	Ratification	Jul 29, 1994	Jul 28, 1995	Ratification
Finland	Dec 10, 1982	Jun 21, 1996	Ratification	Jul 29, 1994	Jun 21, 1996	Ratification
France	Dec 10, 1982	Apr 11, 1996	Ratification	Jul 29, 1994	Apr 11, 1996	Ratification
Gabon	Dec 10, 1982	Mar 11, 1998	Ratification	Apr 4, 1995	Mar 11, 1998	Ratification
Gambia	Dec 10, 1982	May 22, 1984	Ratification			
Georgia		Mar 21, 1996	Accession		Mar 21, 1996	Accession
Germany		Oct 14, 1994	Accession	Jul 29, 1994	Oct 14, 1994	Ratification
Ghana	Dec 10, 1982	Jun 7, 1983	Ratification		Sep 23, 2016	Accession
Greece	Dec 10, 1982	Jul 21, 1995	Ratification	Jul 29, 1994	Jul 21, 1995	Ratification
Grenada	Dec 10, 1982	Apr 25, 1991	Ratification	Nov 14, 1994	Jul 28, 1995	Ratification
Guatemala	Jul 8, 1983	Feb 11, 1997	Ratification		Feb 11, 1997	Accession
Guinea	Oct 4, 1984	Sep 6, 1985	Ratification	Aug 26, 1994	Jul 28, 1995	Ratification
Guinea-Bissau	Dec 10, 1982	Aug 25, 1986	Ratification			
Guyana	Dec 10, 1982	Nov 16, 1993	Ratification		Sep 25, 2008	Accession
Haiti	Dec 10, 1982	Jul 31, 1996	Ratification		Jul 31, 1996	Accession
Honduras	Dec 10, 1982	Oct 5, 1993	Ratification		Jul 28, 2003	Accession
Hungary †	Dec 10, 1982	Feb 5, 2002	Ratification		Feb 5, 2002	Accession
Iceland	Dec 10, 1982	Jun 21, 1985	Ratification	Jul 29, 1994	Jul 28, 1995	Ratification
India	Dec 10, 1982	Jun 29, 1995	Ratification	Jul 29, 1994	Jun 29, 1995	Ratification
Indonesia	Dec 10, 1982	Feb 3, 1986	Ratification	Jul 29, 1994	Jun 2, 2000	Ratification
Iraq	Dec 10, 1982	Jul 30, 1985	Ratification			
Ireland	Dec 10, 1982	Jun 21, 1996	Ratification	Jul 29, 1994	Jun 21, 1996	Ratification
Italy	Dec 7, 1984	Jan 13, 1995	Ratification	Jul 29, 1994	Jan 13, 1995	Ratification
Jamaica	Dec 10, 1982	Mar 21, 1983	Ratification	Jul 29, 1994	Jul 28, 1995	Ratification
Japan	Feb 7, 1983	Jun 20, 1996	Ratification	Jul 29, 1994	Jun 20, 1996	Ratification
Jordan		Nov 27, 1995	Accession		Nov 27, 1995	Accession
Kenya	Dec 10, 1982	Mar 2, 1989	Ratification		Jul 29, 1994	Accession
Kiribati		Feb 24, 2003	Accession		Feb 24, 2003	Accession
South Korea	Mar 14, 1983	Jan 29, 1996	Ratification	Nov 7, 1994	Jan 29, 1996	Ratification
Kuwait	Dec 10, 1982	May 2, 1986	Ratification		Aug 2, 2002	Accession
Kyrgyzstan †		Sep 20, 2025	Accession		Sep 20, 2025	Accession
Laos †	Dec 10, 1982	Jun 5, 1998	Ratification	Oct 27, 1994	Jun 5, 1998	Ratification
Latvia		Dec 23, 2004	Accession		Dec 23, 2004	Accession
Lebanon	Dec 7, 1984	Jan 5, 1995	Ratification		Jan 5, 1995	Accession
Lesotho †	Dec 10, 1982	May 31, 2007	Ratification		May 31, 2007	Accession
Liberia	Dec 10, 1982	Sep 25, 2008	Ratification		Sep 25, 2008	Accession
Lithuania		Nov 12, 2003	Accession		Nov 12, 2003	Accession
Luxembourg †	Dec 5, 1984	Oct 5, 2000	Ratification	Jul 29, 1994	Oct 5, 2000	Ratification
Madagascar	Feb 25, 1983	Aug 22, 2001	Ratification		Aug 22, 2001	Accession
Malawi †	Dec 7, 1984	Sep 28, 2010	Ratification		Sep 28, 2010	Accession
Malaysia	Dec 10, 1982	Oct 14, 1996	Ratification	Aug 2, 1994	Oct 14, 1996	Ratification
Maldives	Dec 10, 1982	Sep 7, 2000	Ratification	Oct 10, 1994	Sep 7, 2000	Ratification
Mali †	Oct 19, 1983	Jul 16, 1985	Ratification			
Malta	Dec 10, 1982	May 20, 1993	Ratification	Jul 29, 1994	Jun 26, 1996	Ratification
Marshall Islands		Aug 9, 1991	Accession			
Mauritania	Dec 10, 1982	Jul 17, 1996	Ratification	Aug 2, 1994	Jul 17, 1996	Ratification
Mauritius	Dec 10, 1982	Nov 4, 1994	Ratification		Nov 4, 1994	Accession
Mexico	Dec 10, 1982	Mar 18, 1983	Ratification		Apr 10, 2003	Accession
Micronesia		Apr 29, 1991	Accession	Aug 10, 1994	Sep 6, 1995	Ratification
Moldova †		Feb 6, 2007	Accession		Feb 6, 2007	Accession
Monaco	Dec 10, 1982	Mar 20, 1996	Ratification	Nov 30, 1994	Mar 20, 1996	Ratification
Mongolia †	Dec 10, 1982	Aug 13, 1996	Ratification	Aug 17, 1994	Aug 13, 1996	Ratification
Montenegro		Oct 23, 2006	Succession from Serbia and Montenegro		Oct 23, 2006	Succession from Serbia and Montenegro
Morocco	Dec 10, 1982	May 31, 2007	Ratification	Oct 19, 1994	May 31, 2007	Ratification
Mozambique	Dec 10, 1982	Mar 13, 1997	Ratification		Mar 13, 1997	Accession
Myanmar	Dec 10, 1982	May 21, 1996	Ratification		May 21, 1996	Accession
Namibia	Dec 10, 1982	Apr 18, 1983	Ratification	Jul 29, 1994	Jul 28, 1995	Ratification
Nauru	Dec 10, 1982	Jan 23, 1996	Ratification		Jan 23, 1996	Accession
Nepal †	Dec 10, 1982	Nov 2, 1998	Ratification		Nov 2, 1998	Accession
Netherlands	Dec 10, 1982	Jun 28, 1996	Ratification	Jul 29, 1994	Jun 28, 1996	Ratification
New Zealand	Dec 10, 1982	Jul 19, 1996	Ratification	Jul 29, 1994	Jul 19, 1996	Ratification
Nicaragua	Dec 9, 1984	May 3, 2000	Ratification		May 3, 2000	Accession
Niger †	Dec 10, 1982	Aug 7, 2013	Ratification		Aug 7, 2013	Accession
Nigeria	Dec 10, 1982	Aug 14, 1986	Ratification	Oct 25, 1994	Jul 28, 1995	Ratification
Niue	Dec 5, 1984	Oct 11, 2006	Ratification		Oct 11, 2006	Accession
North Macedonia †		Aug 19, 1994	Succession from Socialist Federal Republic of Yugoslavia		Aug 19, 1994	Accession
Norway	Dec 10, 1982	Jun 24, 1996	Ratification		Jun 24, 1996	Accession
Oman	Jul 1, 1983	Aug 17, 1989	Ratification		Feb 26, 1997	Accession
Pakistan	Dec 10, 1982	Feb 26, 1997	Ratification	Aug 10, 1994	Feb 26, 1997	Ratification
Palau		Sep 30, 1996	Accession		Sep 30, 1996	Accession
Palestine		Jan 2, 2015	Accession		Jan 2, 2015	Accession
Panama	Dec 10, 1982	Jul 1, 1996	Ratification		Jul 1, 1996	Accession
Papua New Guinea	Dec 10, 1982	Jan 14, 1997	Ratification		Jan 14, 1997	Accession
Paraguay †	Dec 10, 1982	Sep 26, 1986	Ratification	Jul 29, 1994	Jul 10, 1995	Ratification
Philippines	Dec 10, 1982	May 8, 1984	Ratification	Nov 15, 1994	Jul 23, 1997	Ratification
Poland	Dec 10, 1982	Nov 13, 1998	Ratification	Jul 29, 1994	Nov 13, 1998	Ratification
Portugal	Dec 10, 1982	Nov 3, 1997	Ratification	Jul 29, 1994	Nov 3, 1997	Ratification
Qatar	Nov 27, 1984	Dec 9, 2002	Ratification		Dec 9, 2002	Accession
Romania	Dec 10, 1982	Dec 17, 1996	Ratification		Dec 17, 1996	Accession
Russia	Dec 10, 1982	Mar 12, 1997	Ratification		Mar 12, 1997	Accession
Rwanda †	Dec 10, 1982	May 18, 2023	Ratification		May 18, 2023	Accession
Samoa	Sep 28, 1984	Aug 14, 1995	Ratification	Jul 7, 1995	Aug 14, 1995	Ratification
San Marino †		Jul 19, 2024	Accession		Jul 19, 2024	Accession
Sao Tome and Principe	Jul 13, 1983	Nov 3, 1987	Ratification			
Saudi Arabia	Dec 7, 1984	Apr 24, 1996	Ratification		Apr 24, 1996	Accession
Senegal	Dec 10, 1982	Oct 25, 1984	Ratification	Aug 9, 1994	Jul 25, 1995	Ratification
Serbia †		Mar 12, 2001	Succession as Federal Republic of Yugoslavia from Socialist Federal Republic of Yugoslavia	May 12, 1995	Jul 28, 1995	Ratification
Seychelles	Dec 10, 1982	Sep 16, 1991	Ratification	Jul 29, 1994	Dec 15, 1994	Ratification
Sierra Leone	Dec 10, 1982	Dec 12, 1994	Ratification		Dec 12, 1994	Accession
Singapore	Dec 10, 1982	Nov 17, 1994	Ratification		Nov 17, 1994	Accession
Slovakia †	May 28, 1993	May 8, 1996	Ratification; Succession to the signature of Czechoslovakia †	Nov 14, 1994	May 8, 1996	Ratification
Slovenia		Jun 16, 1995	Succession from Socialist Federal Republic of Yugoslavia	Jan 19, 1995	Jun 16, 1995	Ratification
Solomon Islands	Dec 10, 1982	Jun 23, 1997	Ratification		Jun 23, 1997	Accession
Somalia	Dec 10, 1982	Jul 24, 1989	Ratification			
South Africa	Dec 5, 1984	Dec 23, 1997	Ratification	Oct 3, 1994	Dec 23, 1997	Ratification
Spain	Dec 4, 1984	Jan 15, 1997	Ratification	Jul 29, 1994	Jan 15, 1997	Ratification
Sri Lanka	Dec 10, 1982	Jul 19, 1994	Ratification	Jul 29, 1994	Jul 28, 1995	Ratification
St. Kitts and Nevis	Dec 7, 1984	Jan 7, 1993	Ratification			
St. Lucia	Dec 10, 1982	Mar 27, 1985	Ratification			
St. Vincent and the Grenadines	Dec 10, 1982	Oct 1, 1993	Ratification			
Sudan	Dec 10, 1982	Jan 23, 1985	Ratification	Jul 29, 1994		
Suriname	Dec 10, 1982	Jul 9, 1998	Ratification		Jul 9, 1998	Accession
Sweden	Dec 10, 1982	Jun 25, 1996	Ratification	Jul 29, 1994	Jun 25, 1996	Ratification
Switzerland †	Oct 17, 1984	May 1, 2009	Ratification	Oct 26, 1994	May 1, 2009	Ratification
Tanzania	Dec 10, 1982	Sep 30, 1985	Ratification	Oct 7, 1994	Jun 25, 1998	Ratification
Thailand	Dec 10, 1982	May 15, 2011	Ratification		May 15, 2011	Accession
Timor-Leste		Jan 8, 2013	Accession		Jan 8, 2013	Accession
Togo	Dec 10, 1982	Apr 16, 1985	Ratification	Aug 3, 1994	Jul 28, 1995	Ratification
Tonga		Aug 2, 1995	Accession		Aug 2, 1995	Accession
Trinidad and Tobago	Dec 10, 1982	Apr 25, 1986	Ratification	Oct 10, 1994	Jul 28, 1995	Ratification
Tunisia	Dec 10, 1982	Apr 24, 1985	Ratification	May 15, 1995	May 24, 2002	Ratification
Tuvalu	Dec 10, 1982	Dec 9, 2002	Ratification		Dec 9, 2002	Accession
Uganda †	Dec 10, 1982	Nov 9, 1990	Ratification	Aug 9, 1994	Jul 28, 1995	Ratification
Ukraine	Dec 10, 1982	Jul 26, 1999	Ratification	Feb 28, 1995	Jul 26, 1999	Ratification
United Kingdom		Jul 25, 1997	Accession	Jul 29, 1994	Jul 25, 1997	Ratification
Uruguay	Dec 10, 1982	Dec 10, 1992	Ratification	Jul 29, 1994	Aug 7, 2007	Ratification
Vanuatu	Dec 10, 1982	Aug 10, 1999	Ratification	Jul 29, 1994	Aug 10, 1999	Ratification
Vietnam	Dec 10, 1982	Jul 25, 1994	Ratification		Apr 27, 2006	Accession
Yemen	Dec 10, 1982	Jul 21, 1987	Ratification as the People's Democratic Republic of Yemen. Also signed by the Yemen Arab Republic on Dec. 10 1982 prior to Yemeni unification.		Oct 13, 2014	Accession
Zambia †	Dec 10, 1982	Mar 7, 1983	Ratification	Oct 13, 1994	Jul 28, 1995	Ratification
Zimbabwe †	Dec 10, 1982	Feb 24, 1993	Ratification	Oct 28, 1994	Jul 28, 1995	Ratification

== Signatories ==
An additional 12 UN member states have signed the Convention but have not ratified it. One UN member state has signed the Agreement but has not ratified it. Therefore, none of these States are currently parties to either the Convention or the Agreement.

State	Signed Convention	Signed Agreement
Afghanistan †	Mar 18, 1983	
Bhutan †	Dec 10, 1982	
Burundi †	Dec 10, 1982	
Central African Republic †	Dec 4, 1984	
Colombia	Dec 10, 1982	
El Salvador	Dec 5, 1984	
Ethiopia †	Dec 10, 1982	
Iran	Dec 10, 1982	
North Korea	Dec 10, 1982	
Libya	Dec 3, 1984	
Liechtenstein †	Nov 30, 1984	
United Arab Emirates	Dec 10, 1982	
United States		Jul 29, 1994

== Other states ==
There are 13 United Nations member and observer states which have neither signed nor acceded either the Convention or the Agreement:

- Andorra †
- Eritrea
- Israel
- Kazakhstan †
- Peru
- South Sudan †
- Syria
- Tajikistan †
- Turkey
- Turkmenistan †
- Uzbekistan †
- Holy See †
- Venezuela

== United States position ==
Although the United States helped shape the Convention and its subsequent revisions, and though it signed the 1994 Agreement, it has not signed the Convention as it objected – among other things – to Part XI of the Convention. However, it has stated from early on that it considers all of the convention except the parts about deep sea mining to be the same as customary international law.

In 1983 President Ronald Reagan, through Proclamation No. 5030, claimed a 200-mile exclusive economic zone. In December 1988 President Reagan, through Proclamation No. 5928, extended U.S. territorial waters from three nautical miles to twelve nautical miles for national security purposes. However a legal opinion from the Justice Department questioned the President's constitutional authority to extend sovereignty as Congress has the power to make laws concerning the territory belonging to the United States under the U.S. Constitution. In any event, Congress needs to make laws defining if the extended waters, including oil and mineral rights, are under state or federal control.

On 16 July 2012, the U.S. Senate had 34 Republican Senators who indicated their intention to vote against ratification of the Convention if it came to a vote. Since at least two-thirds of the 100 member Senate (at least 67 Senators) are required to ratify a treaty, consideration of the Convention was deferred again.

Some American commentators, including former Secretary of Defense Donald Rumsfeld, have warned that ratification of the Convention might create a precedent with regard to resources of outer space.
