= Libyan Sea =

Portion of the Mediterranean Sea north of the African coast of ancient Libya

- البحر الليبي (Arabic); Λιβυκό πέλαγος (Greek)
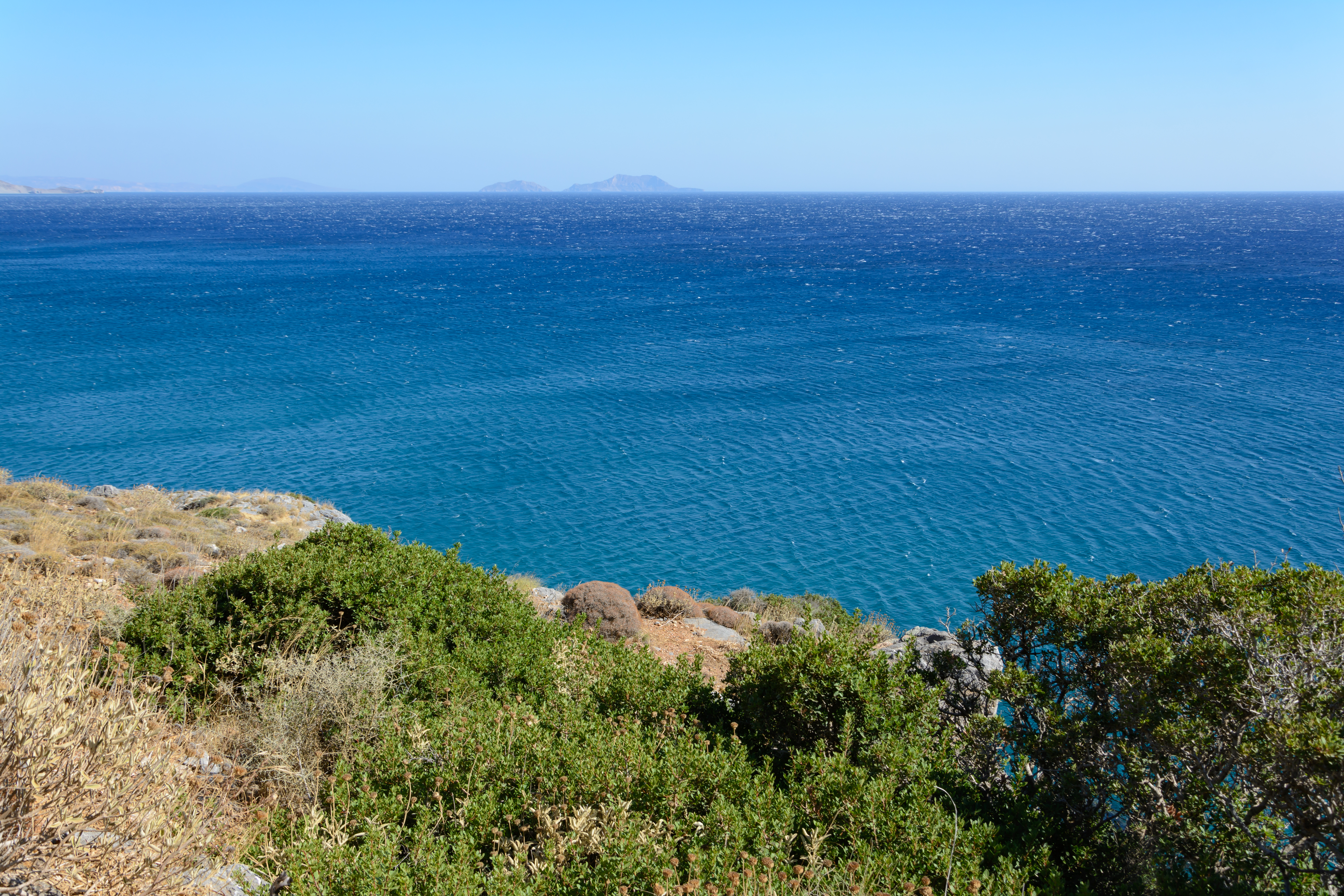
- Paximadia island and the Libyan Sea near the beach of Preveli, Crete

- Location within Mediterranean
- Interactive map of Libyan Sea
- Location: Mediterranean Sea
- Coordinates: 34°00′N 24°24′E
- Type: Sea
- Basin countries: Libya
- Surface area: 350,000 square kilometres (140,000 sq mi)
- Average depth: 1,500 metres (4,900 ft)
- Max. depth: 5,109 metres (16,762 ft)
- Shore length^{1}: 1,770 kilometres (1,100 mi)
- Islands: Gavdos, Gavdopoula, Koufonisi, and Chrysi
- Sections/sub-basins: Gulf of Sidra, South Cretan Sea
- Settlements: Tobruk, Libya and Alexandria, Egypt
- ^{1} Shore length is not a well-defined measure.

The Libyan Sea (Latin: Libycum Mare; Arabic: البحر الليبي; Greek: Λιβυκό πέλαγος) is the portion of the Mediterranean Sea north of the African coast of ancient Libya, i.e. Cyrenaica, and Marmarica (the coast of what is now eastern Libya and western Egypt, between Tobruk and Alexandria). The region of the Libyan Sea located south of Crete has started recently being also named South Cretan Sea (Νότιο Κρητικό Πέλαγος).

== Name ==
The term "Libyan Sea" predates the modern state of Libya and derives from the much broader ancient geographical name "Libya". In antiquity, "Libya" (Greek: Λιβύη, Libyē) encompassed much of North Africa west of the Nile River and referred to its lands and peoples, including groups such as the Libu and Meshwesh. Ancient geographers used "Libyan Sea" (Latin: Mare Libycum) for the part of the Mediterranean Sea south of Crete, between Cyrene and Alexandria. The name remains in use in this historical geographical sense.

== Geography ==
The surface area of the Mediterranean is about 350,000 square kilometres (140,000 sq mi).

The southern coastline of Crete, which borders the Libyan Sea, includes the Asterousia Mountains and Mesara Plain; this area is the locus of considerable ancient Bronze Age settlement including the sites of Kommos, Hagia Triada and Phaistos.

Not counting Crete, other islands in the Libyan Sea are Gavdos, Gavdopoula, Koufonisi, and Chrysi.

To the east is the Levantine Sea, to the north the Ionian Sea, and to the west the Strait of Sicily.

== See also ==
- Asterousia Mountains
- Gulf of Sidra
- Turkish intervention in Libya (2020–present)
- Libya (GNA)–Turkey maritime deal
- Exclusive economic zone of Greece
- Libyan civil war (2014–2020)
- Cyprus–Turkey maritime zones dispute
- Egypt–Greece maritime deal
- Aegean dispute
