= Convention on the High Seas =

1958 International treaty

- Signed: 29 April 1958
- Location: Geneva, Switzerland
- Effective: 30 September 1962
- Parties: 63 states (at 2013)
- Languages: Chinese, English, French, Russian and Spanish

Full text
- Convention on the High Seas at Wikisource
- http://legal.un.org/ilc/texts/instruments/english/conventions/8_1_1958_high_seas.pdf

The Convention on the High Seas is an international treaty which codifies the rules of international law relating to the high seas, otherwise known as international waters. The convention was one of four treaties created at the United Nations Convention on the Law of the Sea (UNCLOS I). The four treaties were signed on 29 April 1958 and entered into force on 30 September 1962, although in keeping with legal tradition, later accession was permitted.

As of 2013, the treaty had been ratified by 63 states, including most NATO-bloc and Soviet-bloc nations but with the notable exceptions of most of the OPEC and Arab league nations like Syria, Egypt, Jordan, Saudi Arabia, and Iran, as well as China, North Korea, and South Korea.

The convention on the High Seas was superseded by the 1982 UNCLOS III, which introduced several new concepts to the law of maritime boundaries including Exclusive Economic Zones.

== Provisions ==
High seas highlighted in dark blue.

The treaty is divided into 37 articles:

- Article 1: Definition of "high seas".
- Article 2: Statement of principles
- Article 3: Access to the sea for landlocked states
- Articles 4–7: the concept of a Flag State
- Article 8: Warships
- Article 9: Other ships in government service
- Articles 10–12: Safety, rescue
- Article 13: Outlawing transport of slaves at sea
- Articles 14–21: Piracy
- Article 22: Boarding of merchant ships by warships
- Article 23: Hot pursuit, that is, pursuit of a vessel across borders for the purposes of law enforcement
- Articles 24–25: Pollution
- Articles 26–29: Submarine cables and pipelines
- Articles 30–37: legal framework, ratification, accession
