= United Nations Convention on the Law of the Sea =

International maritime law

- Logo of the Convention
- Signed: 10 December 1982
- Location: Montego Bay, Jamaica
- Effective: 16 November 1994
- Condition: 60 ratifications
- Signatories: 157
- Parties: 172
- Depositary: Secretary-General of the United Nations
- Languages: Arabic, Chinese, English, French, Russian, and Spanish

Full text
- United Nations Convention on the Law of the Sea at Wikisource

The United Nations Convention on the Law of the Sea (UNCLOS), also called the Law of the Sea Convention or the Law of the Sea Treaty, is an international treaty that establishes a legal framework for all marine and maritime activities. As of October 2024, 169 sovereign states and the European Union are parties to the convention. Some states have refused to recognise the convention.

The convention resulted from the third United Nations Conference on the Law of the Sea (UNCLOS III), which took place between 1973 and 1982. UNCLOS replaced the four treaties of the 1958 Convention on the High Seas. UNCLOS came into force in 1994, a year after Guyana became the 60th nation to ratify the treaty. In 2023, agreement was reached on a High Seas Treaty to be added as an instrument of the convention, to protect ocean life in international waters. This would provide measures including marine protected areas and environmental impact assessments.

While the secretary-general of the United Nations receives instruments of ratification and accession and the UN provides support for meetings of states party to the convention, the United Nations Secretariat has no direct operational role in the implementation of the convention. A UN specialized agency, the International Maritime Organization, does play a role, however, as do other bodies such as the International Whaling Commission and the International Seabed Authority (ISA), which was established by the convention itself.

== Background ==
United Nations Convention on the Law of the Sea replaces the older "freedom of the seas" concept, dating from the 17th century. According to this concept, national rights were limited to a specified belt of water extending from a nation's coastlines, usually 3 nautical miles (5.6 km; 3.5 mi) (three-mile limit), according to the "cannon shot" rule developed by the Dutch jurist Cornelius van Bynkershoek. All waters beyond national boundaries were considered international waters: free to all nations, but belonging to none of them (the mare liberum principle propounded by Hugo Grotius).

In the early 20th century, some nations expressed their desire to extend national claims: to include mineral resources, to protect fish stocks, and to provide the means to enforce pollution controls. The League of Nations called a 1930 conference at The Hague, but no agreements resulted. Using the customary international-law principle of a nation's right to protect its natural resources, Harry S. Truman in 1945 extended United States control to all the natural resources of its continental shelf. Other nations were quick to follow suit. Between 1946 and 1950, Chile, Peru, and Ecuador extended their rights to a distance of 200 nautical miles (370 km; 230 mi) to cover their Humboldt Current fishing grounds. Other nations extended their territorial seas to 12 nautical miles (22 km; 14 mi).

By 1967, only 25 nations still used the old three nautical mile limit, while 66 nations had set a 12-nautical-mile (22 km) territorial limit and eight had set a 200-nautical-mile (370 km) limit. As of 15 July 2011, only Jordan still uses the 3-mile (4.8 km) limit. That limit is also used in certain Australian islands, an area of Belize, some Japanese straits, certain areas of Papua New Guinea, and a few British Overseas Territories, such as Gibraltar.

UNCLOS does not deal with matters of territorial disputes or to resolve issues of sovereignty, as that field is governed by rules of customary international law on the acquisition and loss of territory.

The United Nations Sustainable Development Goal 14 has a target regarding conservative and sustainable use of oceans and their resources in line with UNCLOS legal framework.

== UNCLOS I ==
Territorial waters claims by coastal states in 1960
Breadth claim	Number of states
3-mile limit	26
4-mile limit	3
5-mile limit	1
6-mile limit	16
9-mile limit	1
10-mile limit	2
12-mile limit	34
More than 12-miles	9
Unspecified	11

In 1958, the United Nations held its first Conference on the Law of the Sea (UNCLOS I) at Geneva, Switzerland. UNCLOS I resulted in four treaties concluded in 1958:

- Convention on the Territorial Sea and Contiguous Zone, entry into force: 10 September 1964
- Convention on the Continental Shelf, entry into force: 10 June 1964
- Convention on the High Seas, entry into force: 30 September 1962
- Convention on Fishing and Conservation of Living Resources of the High Seas, entry into force: 20 March 1966

Although UNCLOS I was considered a success, it left open the important issue of breadth of territorial waters.

== UNCLOS II ==
In 1960, the United Nations held the second Conference on the Law of the Sea ("UNCLOS II"); however, the six-week Geneva conference did not result in any new agreements. Generally speaking, developing nations and third world countries participated only as clients, allies, or dependents of the United States or the Soviet Union, with no significant voice of their own.

== UNCLOS III ==
Maritime zones under international law

The issue of varying claims of territorial waters was raised in the UN in 1967 by Arvid Pardo of Malta, and in 1973 the Third United Nations Conference on the Law of the Sea convened in New York. In an attempt to reduce the possibility of groups of nation-states dominating the negotiations, the conference used a consensus process rather than majority vote. With more than 160 nations participating, the conference lasted until 1982. The resulting convention came into force on 16 November 1994, one year after the 60th state, Guyana, ratified the treaty.

The convention introduced a number of provisions. The most significant issues covered were setting limits, navigation, archipelagic status and transit regimes, exclusive economic zones (EEZs), continental shelf jurisdiction, deep seabed mining, the exploitation regime, protection of the marine environment, scientific research, and settlement of disputes.

The convention set the limit of various areas, measured from a carefully defined baseline. (Normally, a sea baseline follows the low-water line, but when the coastline is deeply indented, has fringing islands or is highly unstable, straight baselines may be used.) The areas are as follows:

- Internal waters: Covers all water and waterways on the landward side of the baseline. The coastal state is free to set laws, regulate use, and use any resource. Foreign vessels have no right of passage within internal waters. A vessel in the high seas assumes jurisdiction under the internal laws of its flag state.
- Archipelagic waters: The convention set the definition of "Archipelagic States" in Part IV, which also defines how the state can draw its territorial borders. A baseline is drawn between the outermost points of the outermost islands, subject to these points being sufficiently close to one another. All waters inside this baseline are designated "Archipelagic Waters". The state has sovereignty over these waters to the extent it has over internal waters, but subject to existing rights including traditional fishing rights of immediately adjacent states. Foreign vessels have right of innocent passage through archipelagic waters, but archipelagic states may limit innocent passage to designated sea lanes.
- Territorial sea: Up to 12 nautical miles (22 kilometres; 14 miles) from the baseline, the coastal state is free to set laws, regulate the use, and use any resource; in essence, the coastal State enjoys Sovereign rights and sovereign jurisdiction within its territorial sea. Vessels were given the right of innocent passage through any territorial sea, with strategic straits allowing the passage of military craft as transit passage, in that naval vessels are allowed to maintain postures that would be illegal in the territorial sea. "Innocent passage" is defined by the convention as passing through waters in an expeditious and continuous manner, which is not "prejudicial to the peace, good order or the security" of the coastal state. Fishing, polluting, weapons practice, and spying are not "innocent", and submarines and other underwater vehicles are required to navigate on the surface and to show their flag. Nations can also temporarily suspend innocent passage in specific areas of their territorial sea, if doing so is essential for the protection of their security.
- Contiguous zone: Beyond the 12-nautical-mile (22 km) limit, there is a further 12 nautical miles (22 km) from the territorial sea baseline limit, the contiguous zone. Here a state can continue to enforce laws in four specific areas (customs, taxation, immigration, and pollution) if the infringement started or is about to occur within the state's territory or territorial waters. This makes the contiguous zone a hot pursuit area.
- Exclusive economic zones: These extend 200 nmi (370 km; 230 mi) from the baseline. Within this area, the coastal nation has sole exploitation rights over all natural resources. In casual use, the term may include the territorial sea and even the continental shelf. The EEZs were introduced to halt the increasingly heated clashes over fishing rights, although oil was also becoming important. The success of an offshore oil platform in the Gulf of Mexico in 1947 was soon repeated elsewhere in the world, and by 1970 it was technically feasible to operate in waters 4,000 metres (13,000 ft) deep. Foreign nations have the freedom of navigation and overflight, subject to the regulation of the coastal states. Foreign states may also lay submarine pipes and cables.
- Extended continental shelf: The extended continental shelf is defined as the natural prolongation of the land territory to the continental margin's outer edge. A State's extended continental shelf may exceed 200 nautical miles (370 km) until the natural prolongation ends. However, it may never exceed 350 nmi (650 km; 400 mi) from the baseline; nor may it exceed 100 nmi (190 km; 120 mi) beyond the 2,500 metres (8,200 ft) isobath (the line connecting the depth of 2 500 m). Coastal states have the right to harvest mineral and non-living material in the subsoil of their continental shelf, to the exclusion of others. Coastal states also have exclusive control over living resources "attached" to the continental shelf, but not to creatures living in the water column beyond the exclusive economic zone.

The water column outside these areas is referred to as the "high seas", and the seabed is referred to as "the Area".

Aside from its provisions defining ocean boundaries, the convention establishes general obligations for safeguarding the marine environment and protecting freedom of scientific research on the high seas, and also creates an innovative legal regime for controlling mineral resource exploitation in deep seabed areas beyond national jurisdiction, through an International Seabed Authority and the common heritage of mankind principle.

The convention also established the International Tribunal for the Law of the Sea (ITLOS) in Hamburg, Germany.

Landlocked states are given a right of access to and from the sea, without taxation of traffic through transit states.

== Part XI and the 1994 Agreement ==
Part XI of the convention provides for a regime relating to minerals on the seabed outside any state's territorial waters or exclusive economic zones (EEZ). It establishes an International Seabed Authority (ISA) to authorize seabed exploration and mining and collect and distribute the seabed mining royalty.

On 1 February 2011, the Seabed Disputes Chamber of the International Tribunal for the Law of the Sea (ITLOS) issued an advisory opinion concerning the legal responsibilities and obligations of states parties to the convention with respect to the sponsorship of activities in the area in accordance with Part XI of the convention and the 1994 agreement. The advisory opinion was issued in response to a formal request made by the International Seabed Authority following two prior applications the authority's Legal and Technical Commission had received from the Republic of Nauru and the Kingdom of Tonga regarding proposed activities (a plan of work to explore for polymetallic nodules) to be undertaken in the area by two state-sponsored contractors – Nauru Ocean Resources Inc. (sponsored by the Republic of Nauru) and Tonga Offshore Mining Ltd. (sponsored by the Kingdom of Tonga). The advisory opinion set forth the international legal responsibilities and obligations of sponsoring states and the authority to ensure that sponsored activities do not harm the marine environment, consistent with the applicable provisions of UNCLOS Part XI, Authority regulations, ITLOS case law, other international environmental treaties, and Principle 15 of the UN Rio Declaration.

== Part XII – Protecting the marine environment ==
Part XII of UNCLOS contains special provisions for the protection of the marine environment, obligating all states to collaborate in this matter, as well as placing special obligations on flag states to ensure that ships under their flags adhere to international environmental regulations, often adopted by the IMO. The MARPOL convention is an example of such regulation. Part XII also bestows coastal and port states with broadened jurisdictional rights for enforcing international environmental regulation within their territory and on the high seas.

== High Seas Treaty ==
BBNJ Agreement
Agreement under the United Nations Convention on the Law of the Sea on the Conservation and Sustainable Use of Marine Biological Diversity of Areas Beyond National Jurisdiction
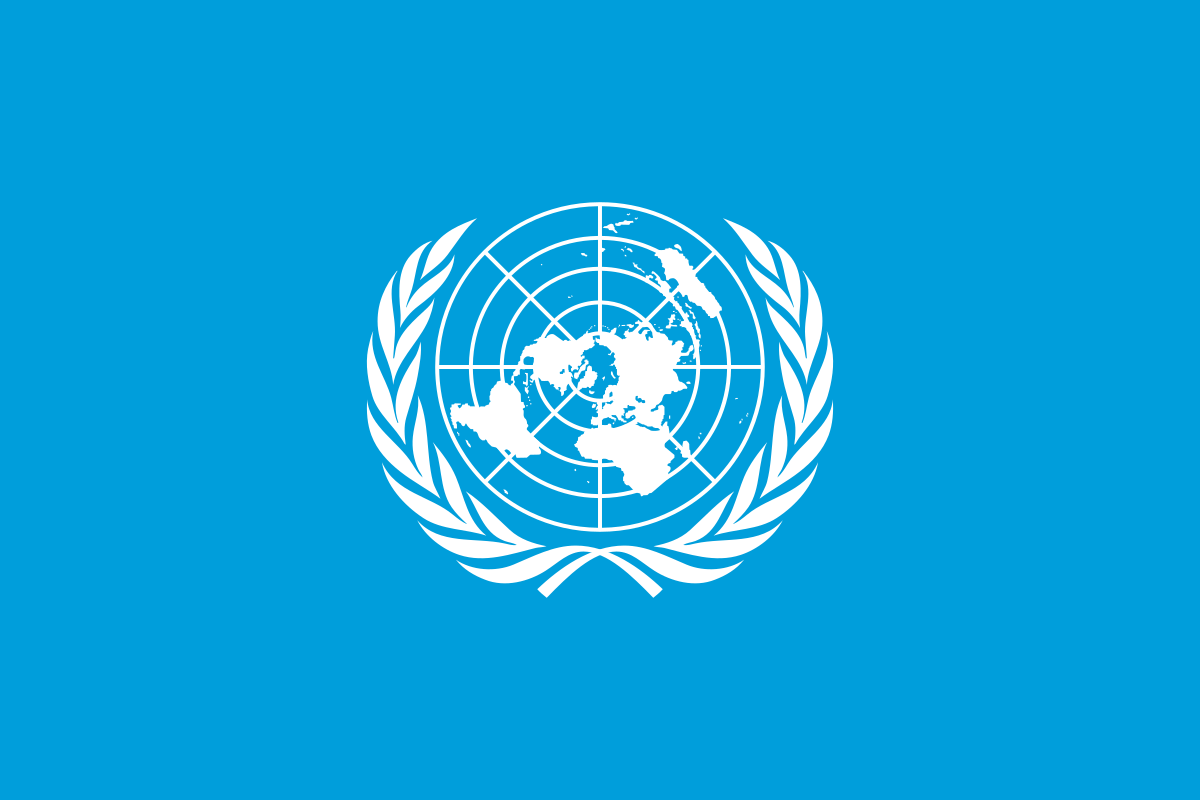
- Type: International legally binding instrument
- Drafted: 4 March 2023
- Signed: 20 September 2023
- Location: New York
- Condition: Ratification by 60 states
- Signatories: 110 countries
- Parties: (17) Bangladesh, Barbados, Belize, Chile, Cuba, France, Maldives, Mauritius, Federated States of Micronesia, Monaco, Palau, Panama, Seychelles, Singapore, Spain, St. Lucia, Timor-Leste

The Agreement under the United Nations Convention on the Law of the Sea on the Conservation and Sustainable Use of Marine Biological Diversity of Areas beyond National Jurisdiction or BBNJ Agreement, commonly known as the High Seas Treaty, is a legally binding instrument for the conservation and sustainable use of marine biological diversity of areas beyond national jurisdiction. It is an agreement under the United Nations Convention on the Law of the Sea (UNCLOS). The text was finalised during an intergovernmental conference at the UN on 4 March 2023 and adopted on 19 June 2023. For entering into force, the treaty needed to be ratified by at least 60 UN member states. On 19 September 2025, Morocco became the 60th country to ratify the agreement, setting the stage for its entry into force in January 2026.

In 2017, the United Nations General Assembly (UNGA) voted to convene an intergovernmental conference (IGC) to consider establishing an international legally binding instrument (ILBI) on the conservation and sustainable use of marine biodiversity beyond national jurisdiction (BBNJ). This was considered necessary because UNCLOS did not provide a framework for areas beyond national jurisdiction. There was a particular concern for marine biodiversity and the impact of overfishing on global fish stocks and ecosystem stability.

The treaty addresses four themes: (1) marine genetic resources (MGRs) and their digital sequence information (genetic data), including the fair and equitable sharing of benefits; (2) area-based management tools (ABMTs), including marine protected areas (MPAs); (3) environmental impact assessments (EIAs); and (4) capacity building and transfer of marine technology (CB&TMT). The area-based management tools and environmental impact assessments relate mainly to conservation and sustainable use of marine biodiversity, while the marine genetic resources and capacity building and transfer of marine technology include issues of economic justice and equity.

Greenpeace called it "the biggest conservation victory ever". The main achievement is the new possibility to create marine protected areas in international waters. By doing so the agreement now makes it possible to protect 30% of the oceans by 2030 (part of the 30 by 30 target). Though the agreement does not directly address climate change, it also serves as a step towards protecting the ecosystems that store carbon in sediments.

The High Seas Treaty has 76 articles and two annexes. One of its main aims is "to act as stewards of the ocean in areas beyond national jurisdiction on behalf of present and future generations by protecting, caring for and ensuring responsible use of the marine environment, maintaining the integrity of ocean ecosystems and conserving the inherent value of biological diversity of areas beyond national jurisdiction". The Agreement recognizes traditional knowledge. It has articles regarding the "polluter-pays" principle, and different impacts of human activities including areas beyond the national jurisdiction of the countries making those activities. The agreement was adopted by the 193 United Nations Member States.

Both states and regional economic integration organizations can become parties to the Agreement. The former treaty, UNCLOS, was adopted in 1982 and entered into force in 1994. As of October 2024, UNCLOS has 170 parties. The European Union pledged financial support for the process of ratification and implementation of the treaty.

== Parties ==
Parties Parties, dually represented by the European Union Signatories Non-parties

The convention was opened for signature on 10 December 1982 and entered into force on 16 November 1994 upon deposition of the 60th instrument of ratification. The convention has been ratified by 172 parties, which includes 168 UN member states, one UN Observer state (Palestine), two non-member states (the Cook Islands and Niue) and the European Union.

=== Role ===
The significance of UNCLOS stems from the fact that it systemizes and codifies the standards and principles of international maritime law, which are based on centuries of maritime experience and are expressed to a great extent in the United Nations Charter and current international maritime law norms, such as the Geneva Conventions of 1958. A large portion of these requirements were further strengthened and expanded.

== Non-parties ==
A number of nations have signed the Convention but have not ratified it. Other nations have not signed it at all. Many of these are landlocked countries which would not have an Exclusive Economic Zone anyway.

=== Signed but not ratified ===
- Afghanistan
- Bhutan
- Burundi
- Central African Republic
- Colombia
- El Salvador
- Ethiopia
- Iran
- Libya
- Liechtenstein
- North Korea
- United Arab Emirates
- United States (see United States and the United Nations Convention on the Law of the Sea)

=== Not signed ===
- Andorra
- Eritrea
- Israel
- Kazakhstan
- Peru
- South Sudan
- Syria
- Tajikistan
- Turkey
- Turkmenistan
- Uzbekistan
- Venezuela

== See also ==
- Automatic identification system – Tracking system using transceivers on ships
- International Seabed Authority – Intergovernmental body to regulate mineral-related activities on the seabed
- International Tribunal for the Law of the Sea – Intergovernmental organization
- Law of the sea – International law concerning maritime environments
- Law of salvage – Principle of maritime law
- Maritime Security Regimes – Security portions of customary maritime law
- Montreux Convention Regarding the Regime of the Straits – 1936 treaty governing the Bosporus and Dardanelles straits
- Seabed Arms Control Treaty – 1971 international agreement limiting nuclear weapons on the sea floor
- United States and the United Nations Convention on the Law of the Sea – American involvement in drafting but non-ratification
- US/USSR Joint Statement on Uniform Acceptance of Rules of International Law Governing Innocent Passage – 1989 statement of common understanding
- Virginia Commentary – Literary work on international law
