= 2018 Cyprus gas dispute =

Dispute over natural gas around Cyprus

The 2018 Cyprus gas dispute is a diplomatic dispute involving the exclusive economic zone (EEZ) of the Republic of Cyprus (in partnership with Greece and Egypt) in the eastern Mediterranean, which began on February 6, 2018. The dispute followed remarks made by Turkey's foreign minister Mevlüt Çavuşoğlu, rejecting a 2003 Cypriot-Egyptian maritime border demarcation deal and announcing the Turkish government's intention to carry out gas exploration in the region. Tensions in the region further escalated on February 9, when the Turkish Navy blocked a drill ship operated by Italian oil company Eni S.p.A., licensed by the government of the Republic of Cyprus, from exploring gas reserves off the island.

Çavuşoğlu said during his interview with the Greek newspaper Kathimerini that Turkish Cypriots have "undeniable rights" to the Cypriot EEZ. Egypt's Foreign Ministry reacted by warning Turkey not to contest the 2013 deal and Egyptian economic interests in the region, adding that any attempts to do so would be confronted. The Cypriot government officials have emphasised that any future benefits are for all Cypriots, including the Turkish Cypriots, but only after a comprehensive settlement of the Cyprus problem. On February 16, Eni CEO Claudio Descalzi stated that the Turkish blockade of its drill ship, Saipem 12000, was out of Eni's hands and that the issue was being discussed by involved parties. In November 2018, the partnership of the Cypriot government and US company ExxonMobil successfully began carrying out hydrocarbon exploration, escorted by US Navy ships, with Turkey remaining passive.

== Background ==
In the early 1970s, the Republic of Cyprus (RoC) gave oil companies permission to search the island's waters for hydrocarbons, and the first exploration started in 1977. Earlier, in 1974, Turkey invaded Cyprus, leaving in its wake an unresolved ethnic dispute and the Turkish Republic of Northern Cyprus (TRNC) occupying the northern part of the island, which is only recognized by Turkey.

In 2002, the Turkish Navy prevented Northern Alliance, a ship operated by a RoC-commissioned Norwegian company, from exploring the Cypriot EEZ. In 2003, the governments of Cyprus and Egypt signed maritime border agreement delineating their respective EEZs. (Note: Egypt and Greece signed a similar agreement in February 2004.) Cyprus also signed a similar agreement with the government of Lebanon in January 2007. Later that same month, the RoC defined thirteen zones (named "Blocks") in its EEZ, and invited tenders for eleven of them in the following months. Turkey, a non-signatory to the United Nations Convention on the Law of the Sea, claims Block 3 of the Cypriot EEZ as part of its continental shelf.

In November 2008, a Turkish Navy vessel was involved in a standoff with two ships operated by Norwegian company Petroleum Geo-Services, a day before the Turkish Petroleum Corporation was given Ankara's permission to explore waters claimed by the Cypriot government. Three days later, the RoC found Malene Ostervold, a Norwegian-flagged ship commissioned by Turkey, surveying the region's waters. Ankara believes the Turkish Cypriot community should be allowed to benefit from the island's offshore resources. In 2014, Turkey deployed two warships to the Cypriot EEZ and started conducting seismic surveys in the region. Cypriot president Nicos Anastasiades responded by suspending unification talks with his Turkish Cypriot counterpart, Derviş Eroğlu. During a trilateral summit with Cyprus in Cairo, Egypt and Greece expressed their disapproval of the Turkish moves. They also outlined plans for energy cooperation in the eastern Mediterranean. Ankara responded by stating that the Turkish Navy would apply the rules of engagement should it encounter any warship in the region.

In 2015, the Zohr Field was discovered by Eni in the Egyptian EEZ, setting off a gas exploration race in the eastern Mediterranean. Zohr also revived the Cypriot gas industry's potential to be part of regional projects, such as a gas pipeline to Europe. Other initiatives include a pipeline to Egypt's decommissioned liquefaction plants and shipping the produced liquefied natural gas (LNG) from Egyptian terminals to foreign markets.

== Timeline ==
The 2018 Cyprus gas dispute began on February 6, 2018. The dispute followed remarks made by Turkey's foreign minister Mevlüt Çavuşoğlu, rejecting a 2003 Cypriot-Egyptian maritime border demarcation deal and announcing the Turkish government's intention to carry out gas exploration in the region. Tensions in the region further escalated on February 9, when the Turkish Navy blocked a drill ship operated by Italian oil company Eni S.p.A., licensed by the government of the Republic of Cyprus, from exploring gas reserves off the island.

Çavuşoğlu said during his interview with Kathimerini that Turkish Cypriots represented by the Turkish Republic of Northern Cyprus (only recognized by Turkey), have "undeniable rights" to the Cypriot EEZ. Egypt's Foreign Ministry reacted by warning Turkey not to contest the 2013 deal and Egyptian economic interests in the region, adding that any attempts to do so would be confronted. The Cypriot government officials have emphasised that any future benefits are for all Cypriots, including the Turkish Cypriots, but only after a comprehensive settlement of the Cyprus problem. On February 16, Eni CEO Claudio Descalzi stated that the Turkish blockade of its drill ship, Saipem 12000, was out of Eni's hands and that the issue was being discussed by involved parties.

On November 16, the partnership of the Cypriot government and US company ExxonMobil successfully began carrying out hydrocarbon exploration, escorted by US Navy ships, with Turkey remaining passive. The Turkish Foreign Ministry responded with a statement in which its spokesman, Hami Aksoy, vowed that Turkey would begin drilling operations of its own in Cypriot waters. Meral Aksener, a prominent opposition leader and head of the Good Party, addressed the Turkish parliament calling for a repeated invasion of Cyprus saying "You should know that if need be 'Ayşe will go on holiday again'", a reference to the code phrase that was used as a signal for the 1974 invasion. She additionally said that "Cyprus is Turkish and will remain Turkish".

In July 2019, the European Council adopted the following conclusions on the Turkish drilling activities in the Eastern Mediterranean:

- Calls again on Turkey to act in a spirit of good neighbourliness and respect the sovereignty and sovereign rights of Cyprus in accordance with international law.
- Welcomes the invitation by the Government of Cyprus to negotiate with Turkey on delimitation of exclusive economic zones and the continental shelf through dialogue and in full respect of international law.
- The EU remains fully committed to supporting the UN-led efforts to work with the parties with a view to creating the conditions conducive to resuming negotiations on a comprehensive settlement of the Cyprus problem.
- To suspend negotiations on the Comprehensive air transport agreement and not to hold further meetings of the EU-Turkey high-level dialogues.
- The Council endorses the Commission's proposal to reduce the pre-accession assistance to Turkey for 2020 and invites the European Investment Bank to review its lending activities in Turkey.
- In accordance with the European Council conclusions of 20 June, invites the High Representative and the Commission to continue work on options for targeted measures in light of Turkey's continued drilling activities.
- The Council will closely monitor developments and will revert to this issue as appropriate.

== See also ==
- Aphrodite gas field
- Zohr field
- Leviathan gas field
- Tamar gas field
- Noble Energy
- Greece–Israel relations
- Cyprus–Egypt relations
- Cyprus–Israel relations
