= EastMed =

EastMed is an abbreviation for "Eastern Mediterranean", used as a short name for:

- East Mediterranean pipeline
- East Mediterranean Gas Forum (EMGF)
