= Blue Homeland =

Turkish strategic-maritime and irredentist doctrine

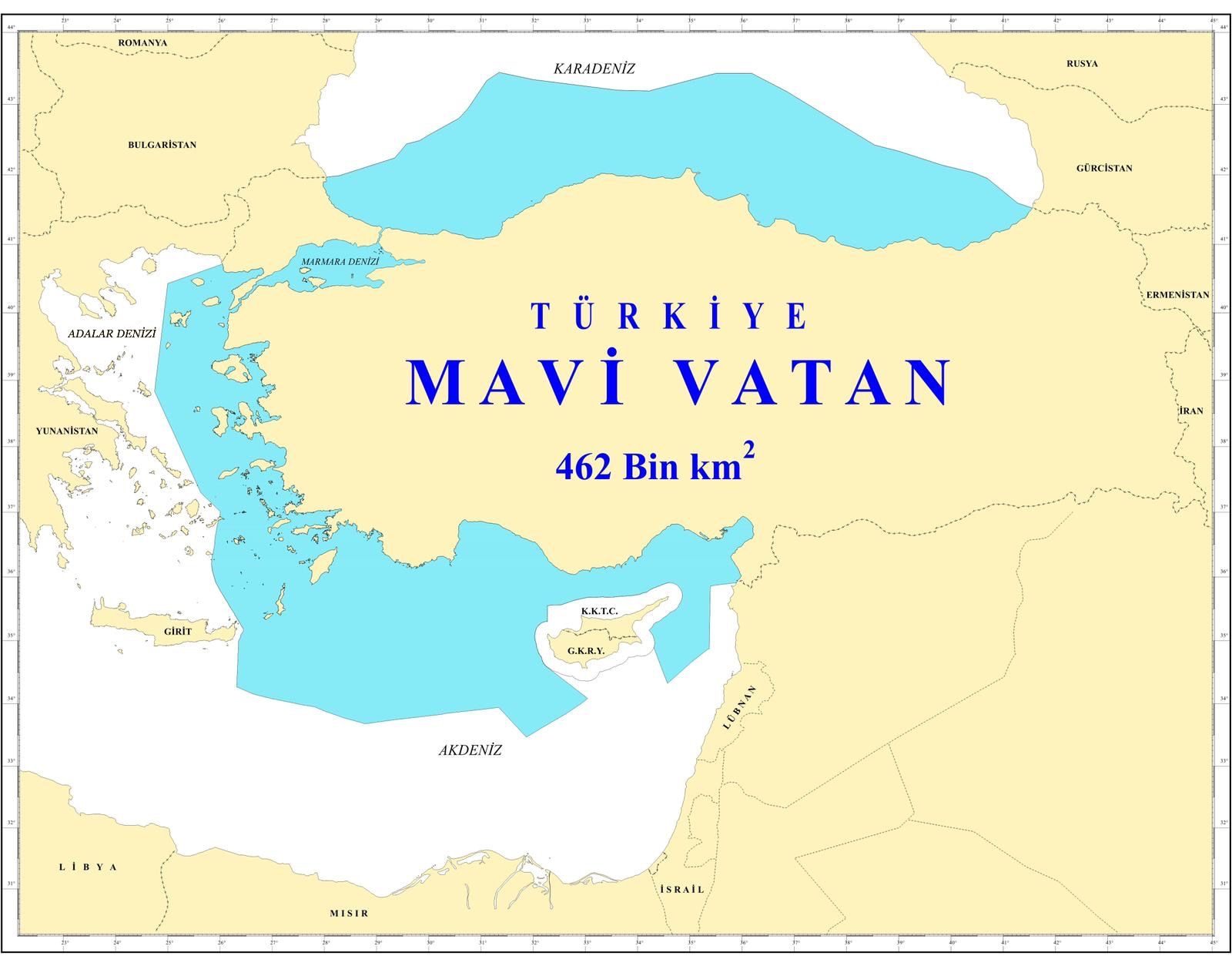
Blue Homeland map created by Cihat Yaycı

The Blue Homeland (Turkish: Mavi Vatan) is an irredentist and expansionist concept and doctrine, (Note: See:) created by the Chief of Staff of the Turkish Navy Commander Cihat Yaycı, and developed with Admiral Cem Gurdeniz in 2006. The doctrine is representing Turkey's territorial sea, continental shelf, and exclusive economic zone (EEZ) around the Black Sea, as well as its claims of continental shelf and EEZ in the eastern Mediterranean, and the Aegean. The doctrine rejects the United Nations Convention on the Law of the Sea (UNCLOS; which Turkey has not ratified) and advocates for control over roughly 462,000 km^{2} (178,380 mi^{2}) of maritime territory.

First promoted in 2006, it was politicized after the July 2016 failed coup attempt as part of the Republic of Turkey's pursuit of strategic autonomy. Since 2019, Blue Homeland has been effected via a maritime boundary memorandum of understanding with Libya and the annual Mavi Vatan naval exercises, drawing criticism from Greece, Cyprus, the European Union and NATO for challenging established maritime norms and intensifying regional security and energy disputes. Also in 2019, a senior official of the Turkish Naval Forces stated that Turkey was "ready to protect every swath of our 462,000 square kilometer blue homeland with great determination," while the German Institute for International and Security Affairs described the doctrine as a "neo-Ottoman" and "neo-imperial" agenda.

== Background ==
In 1947, US President Truman introduced an understanding that defined the maritime jurisdictions of countries, called the continental shelf, for oil exploration and extraction operations in the western United States and accepted that the seas were also a part of the countries. The concept of the continental shelf, formalized in 1958 by the Geneva Convention on the Law of the Sea, prepared the ground for the Blue Homeland doctrine.

With the note given to the UN on March 2, 2004, Turkey claimed for the first time that it had sovereign rights in some western regions. In the note given to the UN dated 4 October 2005, it was reported that the sea areas between 32° 16" 18' and 28° East longitude, north of 34° North latitude, were its own continental shelf and that it would extend to the point where the Turkish-Greek continental shelf border in the Aegean Sea reached the Mediterranean, west of 28° East longitude, and in 2006, the Turkish Naval Forces launched Operation Mediterranean Shield in the region. The concept of the Blue Homeland was first put forward by Cem Gürdeniz at the symposium on the Black Sea and Maritime Security held at the Naval Forces Command on June 14, 2006. The concept that Cihat Yaycı contributed to the development of was recorded in Cihat Yaycı's book titled Basic Maritime Law in 2010. After 2015, the Blue Homeland played an active role in Turkey's implementation of a strategy based on military power in maritime areas and In 2019, for the first time in Turkish history, the Blue Homeland Drill was held simultaneously in the Black Sea, Aegean and Mediterranean.

The Blue Homeland doctrine has been interpreted as a maritime counterpart to Ahmet Davutoğlu's "Strategic Depth" doctrine; Both doctrines aim to establish Turkey as a great power; however, the two doctrines differ in their ideological origins and strategic emphasis: Blue Homeland emerged from secular-nationalist circles within the Turkish Navy and places greater emphasis on maritime claims and naval power, contrasting with the diplomacy and soft-power-oriented approach initially associated with Davutoğlu and the AKP.

=== Turkey–Libya EEZ agreement ===
The agreement between Turkey and the Government of National Accord of Libya on the delimitation of maritime jurisdiction areas is one of the concrete steps of the Blue Homeland doctrine. Cihat Yaycı, one of the key figures in the agreement, resigned from his position on May 18, 2020.

On November 27, 2019, the memorandum of understanding between the government of Turkey and the government of Libya on the delimitation of maritime jurisdiction areas in the Mediterranean was signed in Istanbul and was found to be in compliance with Law No. 7195 in Turkey. It was published in the Official Gazette on December 7, 2019, and entered into force in domestic law. In Libya, it was approved on December 6, 2019, and entered into force in Libyan domestic law. Thanks to this agreement, which was announced to the world by notifying the UN, Libya and Turkey became neighbors by sea.

The agreement was controversial and drew widespread condemnation by the states in the region and the international community, including the rival Tobruk-based government led by Libya's Parliament (House of Representatives) and the Libyan National Army, the European Union, the United States of America, Greece, Russia, Egypt, Cyprus, Malta, France, Germany, Italy, Sweden, Serbia, Israel, Syria, Bahrain, Saudi Arabia, the United Arab Emirates and the Arab League, as a violation of the International Law of the Sea (UNCLOS) and the article 8 of the Skhirat Agreement which prohibits the Libyan Prime Minister from making international agreements without the unanimous consent of the cabinet members.

=== Important names ===
==== Cem Gürdeniz ====
The first person to use the concept of the Blue Homeland was Cem Gürdeniz. Cem Gürdeniz argues that the defense of Turkey should begin in the "Blue Homeland", citing Atatürk's words during the Battle of Gallipoli, "I am not ordering you to fight, I am ordering you to die. (Note: According to Erickson the order Kemal gave this order to the Ottoman 57th Infantry Regiment: "I do not expect you to fight, I order you to die. In the time which passes until we die, other troops and commanders can come forward and take our places".)"

==== Cihat Yaycı ====
He is the person who wrote the doctrine that turned the term Blue Homeland into a doctrine and ensured that it took its place in the literature through an interdisciplinary study. He also has multiple articles and books on the subject. The person who drew the current Blue Homeland map known today is Rear Admiral Cihat Yaycı. Continuing his studies, Yaycı has a research center called Türk DEGS.

== See also ==
- Misak-ı Millî
- Megali Idea
- Montreux Convention Regarding the Regime of the Straits
- Aegean dispute
- Cyprus–Turkey maritime zones dispute

== Notes ==
This article uses material from the Wikipedia article Libya (GNA)–Turkey maritime deal, which is released under the Creative Commons Attribution-ShareAlike 4.0 International License (view authors).	Wikipedia logo

== Sources ==
- Erickson, Edward J. (2001) [2000]. Ordered to Die: A History of the Ottoman Army in the First World War. Westport, Connecticut: Greenwood. ISBN 978-0-313-31516-9. LCCN 00-021562. OCLC 43481698. OL 6778537M.
