= Adva Network Security =

German network security company

Adva Network Security GmbH is a network security company based in Berlin, Germany, with additional locations in Meiningen and Munich. It designs and manufactures secure data transmission solutions for use in optical and Ethernet networks. The company's technology is used by government agencies, enterprises and network operators who require high levels of data security.

== History ==
Adva Network Security was set up by Adva Optical Networking SE (ADVA) in 2022. ADVA, which subsequently entered into a business combination with the US-based ADTRAN Holdings, Inc. (Adtran), announced on October 4, 2022 that Adva Network Security would operate in Germany and that it would use its own data center and IT infrastructure to develop and manufacture optical and Ethernet security solutions, including quantum encryption technology. Adva Network Security and Adtran function as separate entities. However, Adva Network Security remains a subsidiary of Adtran and the technology produced by the respective companies is designed to interoperate.

== Technology ==
Adva Network Security's optical and Ethernet products include the FSP 150-XG118Pro (CSH), a multi-layer encryption device that combines with its ConnectGuard technology and Adtran's FSP 3000 open line system to provide Layer 1, Layer 2 and Layer 3 encryption. Its Layer 1 and 2 encryption solutions have BSI (German Federal Office for Information Security) approval for the transmission of classified data, in addition to NATO/EU Restricted and Confidential data. They also leverage post-quantum algorithms to secure data in motion against future threats posed by quantum computers. The company also offers services such as 24/7 maintenance, various service packages, a customer portal, SOC-as-a-service, penetration testing, network planning and staff training.

== Collaborations and projects ==
Genua Partnership: Adva Network Security has entered into a strategic partnership with Genua, a German IT security specialist. Together, they offer integrated solutions for secure Metro and VPN networks, targeting customers with high protection requirements.

IPCEI-CIS Project: Adva Network Security is involved in the Important Projects of Common European Interest (IPCEI) initiative to develop cloud-optimized, secure network access technology. The project aims to enhance digital sovereignty in Europe by creating secure cloud infrastructure.

DemoQuandt: As part of the DemoQuanDT research project, Adva Network Security is contributing to the development of quantum-safe communication systems that combine post-quantum cryptography and quantum key distribution (QKD). The project is funded by the German Federal Ministry of Education and Research and focuses on practical implications for critical infrastructures.

De-QOR: In the De-QOR project, Adva Network Security is involved in developing quantum-safe optical transmission technologies for use in wide area networks. The project aims to explore new approaches to securing data traffic over optical fiber against emerging quantum threats.

== Corporate structure ==
Michael Roth and Josef Sißmeir are the general managers of Adva Network Security. The company has 51-200 employees.
