= East Mediterranean Gas Forum =

- Abbreviation: EMGF
- Formation: 22 September 2020; 6 years ago (formal charter signing); 9 March 2021 (charter entering into force)
- Type: International organization
- Headquarters: Cairo, Egypt
- Members: Full members: Cyprus; Egypt; France; Greece; Israel; Italy; Jordan; Palestine; Observers: European Union; United States

The East Mediterranean Gas Forum (EMGF or EGF), also known as the EastMed Gas Forum or simply EastMed, is an international organization formed by Cyprus, Egypt, France, Greece, Israel, Italy, Jordan, and Palestine. Informally established in 2019, the organization's formal charter was signed in September 2020, which an additional framework agreement signed in January 16, and the charter legally entering into force by March 9, 2021. Its headquarters are located in Cairo, Egypt.

== History ==
Originally, the bloc was an informal forum of Egypt, Cyprus, Israel, and Greece. Major companies, such as Total S.A., Eni and Novatek and Exxon, have signed exploration and production agreements concerning gas with those governments.

On September 22, 2020, the member countries signed a formal charter to create a new intergovernmental organization. Subsequently, France asked to join the Forum as a member while the European Union and UAE wish to join as permanent observers. On 9 March 2021, France's membership to the EMGF was approved, while the United Arab Emirate's membership was vetoed by Palestine in the EMGF's Ministerial conference which was held at Cairo, Egypt. Lebanon was invited to join the forum but declined the invitation due to Israel's participation. The organization also announced on 9 March that its charter had officially entered into effect.

On 15 June 2022 it was announced at the EGMF that the EU, Egypt and Israel had reached an accord that would see the supply of gas to the EU, in order that the latter could reduce its dependence on Russia, which in 2021 supplied the EU with roughly 40 percent of its gas. According to the deal, gas from Israel will be brought via a pipeline to the LNG terminal on the Egypt's Mediterranean coast before being transported on tankers to the European shores. Reports were afoot that Russia cut its exports to Europe on the same day "as a sign of displeasure at the deal signed in Cairo." As a deal sweetener Ursula von der Leyen pledged food relief worth $104 million for Egypt, which has been reeling from grain shortages as a result of the Russian invasion of Ukraine, as well as 3 billion euros in "agriculture, nutrition, water and sanitation programmes over the next years here in the region". The EU's new policy is to be fully independent of Russian fossil fuels before 2030. The subject of the agreement, white gas, is found in underground deposits and created through fracking.

== Members & observers ==
Current members:

- Cyprus
- Egypt
- France
- Greece
- Israel
- Italy
- Jordan
- Palestine

Permanent Observer:

- European Union
- United States
- World Bank Group

Status Unclear:

- United Arab Emirates - Observership reportedly vetoed by Palestine in March 2021 despite earlier reports that it had already become an observer in December 2020.

== See also ==
- Eastern Mediterranean
- EastMed pipeline
