= EastMed pipeline =

Proposed natural gas pipeline through Eastern Mediterranean Sea

EastMed
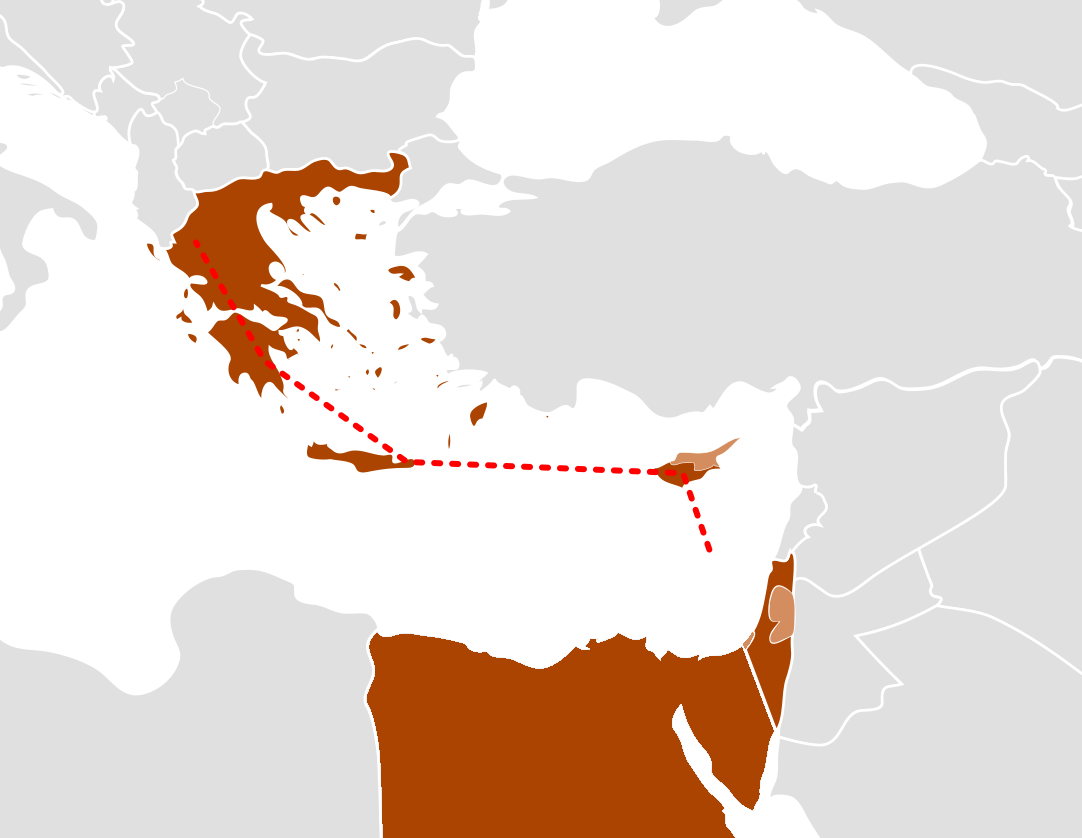
- Map of the proposed EastMed pipeline

Location
- Country: Greece; Cyprus; Israel
- Direction: East–West

General information
- Type: Natural gas
- Partners: DEPA; Edison

Technical information
- Length: 1,900 km (1,200 mi)
- Maximum discharge: 10 billion cubic metres per annum (350×10^{9} cu ft/a)

The Eastern Mediterranean pipeline or simply EastMed was a planned offshore/onshore natural gas pipeline, directly connecting East Mediterranean energy resources to mainland Greece via Cyprus and Crete. The project, currently in design, would transport natural gas from the off-shore gas reserves in the Levantine Basin into Greece, and in conjunction with the Poseidon and IGB pipelines into Italy and other European regions. The pipeline will have a length of approximately 1,900 km, reach depths of 3km, and have a capacity of 10 billion cubic meters per year. Construction of the pipeline is expected to cost approximately €6 billion (US$6.86 billion). The pipeline is being developed by IGI Poseidon S.A., a 50-50% joint venture between the Greek gas utility DEPA and the Italian gas utility Edison.

On 2 January 2020, the EastMed Pipeline accord was signed in Athens by the leaders of Greece, Cyprus, and Israel. On 19 July 2020, the Israeli government officially approved the accord, allowing the signatory countries to move forward with plans to complete the pipeline by 2025.

However, following the withdrawal of support from the United States in January 2022, and continued objections by Turkey, it is likely that the pipeline may be rerouted through Egypt to bypass Cyprus, or cancelled altogether.

== Timeline ==
In 2013, the construction of the EastMed pipeline was designated under European Commission Regulation 347/2013 as a Project of Common Interest and during the 2015-2018 period the Commission contributed more than €34.5 million (US$38.9 million) to complete technical, economic and environmental studies for the project.

The Energy Triangle of Greece, Cyprus, and Israel signed an intergovernmental agreement for the EastMed gas pipeline in Tel Aviv on 20 March 2019 in the presence of United States Secretary of State Mike Pompeo, in a sign of support from Washington for the project. American interest on the pipeline is explained by Washington's demand that its European partners maintain a diversification policy of their energy imports. The pipeline will diversify European gas supplies and lessen dependence on Russian Natural Gas.

In April 2019, the European Commission labeled the EastMed pipeline as a Project of Common Interest, having contributed €34.5 million (US$38.9 million) to complete technical studies for the project. On 7 May 2019, Italian prime minister Giuseppe Conte stated, at an event near Rome, that Italy will oppose the construction of Poseidon pipeline; the last section of EastMed connecting Greece and Italy via the Adriatic Sea, putting the entire project under consideration. However, on 1 January 2020, it was reported that the Italian Minister of Economic Development Stefano Patuanelli had sent to his Greek counterpart a letter of support for the EastMed pipeline, thus reinstating the backing of Italy for the project.

On 2 January 2020, the accord to construct the pipeline was signed in Athens by the leaders of Greece, Cyprus, and Israel. Cypriot President Nikos Anastasiadis and Israeli Prime Minister Benjamin Netanyahu characterised the accord as "historic". The accord includes provisions for ensuring the security of the pipeline and a common tax regime. The Israeli government approved the accord on 19 July 2020, allowing the project to move forward.

In January 2022, the United States announced that it was withdrawing its support for the project, saying that it was not economically viable or environmentally friendly, and that it could create diplomatic tensions, meaning the project is likely to be cancelled and replaced with an energy connection between Egypt and Greece. U.S. House of Representatives members Gus Bilirakis (R-Florida) and Nicole Malliotakis (R-New York) have questioned the Biden administration's reversal on the project in view of Europe's deepening dependency on Russian gas.

== Route ==
The pipeline will connect the Leviathan (Israel) and Aphrodite (Cyprus) gas fields in the Eastern Mediterranean to Europe. The pipeline will begin in the Levantine Basin and make landfall in Cyprus, where a compressor station will be located. From Cyprus, the pipeline will continue west for approximately 700 km, reaching depths of 3 km, and make landfall in eastern Crete. A compressor station on Crete will enable the supply of natural gas to the island. From Crete, the pipeline will continue northwest and make landfall in the eastern Peloponnese, near the village of Agios Fokas. The pipeline will cross the Peloponnese in a NW direction, cross the Gulf of Patras, and continue along western mainland Greece, ending in the Thesprotia region. From there, the proposed Poseidon pipeline will connect to Italy.

Turkey has stated that they are strongly opposed to the pipeline project, claiming to have been intentionally excluded. The final signing of the project came in a period with Turkish exploration in the area and shortly after the signing of the EEZ agreement between Turkey and Libya.

On 19 May 2023, Claudio Descalzi, the CEO of Italian energy company Eni, said that any agreement for the construction of the EastMed pipeline must include Turkey; he added that "there are disputes between Turkey and Cyprus that are difficult to remedy, furthermore Turkey has made an agreement with Libya to define a very vast platform that covers almost the entire EastMed, therefore not only Turkey but also Libya will have a say." In response to these comments, George Papanastasiou, the Cypriot Minister of Energy, Commerce and Industry, stated that not all people agree with the opinions expressed by Descalzi, and that he respects his opinion. These remarks follow reports that Eni, Cyprus and Israel are working on a deal for constructing a natural gas pipeline in the Eastern Mediterranean, connecting both the Cypriot and Israeli offshore gas fields to a processing plant in Cyprus, where the gas will be liquefied for export by ship to Italy and the rest of Europe.

== EastMed Gas Forum ==
In January 2019, seven energy ministers in the region penned a deal to set up the East Mediterranean Gas Forum. Total S.A., Eni and Novatek and Exxon have signed exploration and production agreements with the relevant governments. The current members of the group are: Cyprus, Egypt, France, Greece, Israel, Italy, Jordan, and the Palestinian Authority. In January 2020, France and the United States asked to join the Forum, as a member and permanent observer respectively.

== See also ==
- Aphrodite gas field
- Leviathan gas field
- Energy in the European Union
- Energy in Greece
- Energy in Israel
- Energy Triangle
- EuroAsia Interconnector
