= Cihat Yaycı =

Turkish admiral, author and academician

(R) Admiral Assoc. Prof. Cihat Yaycı
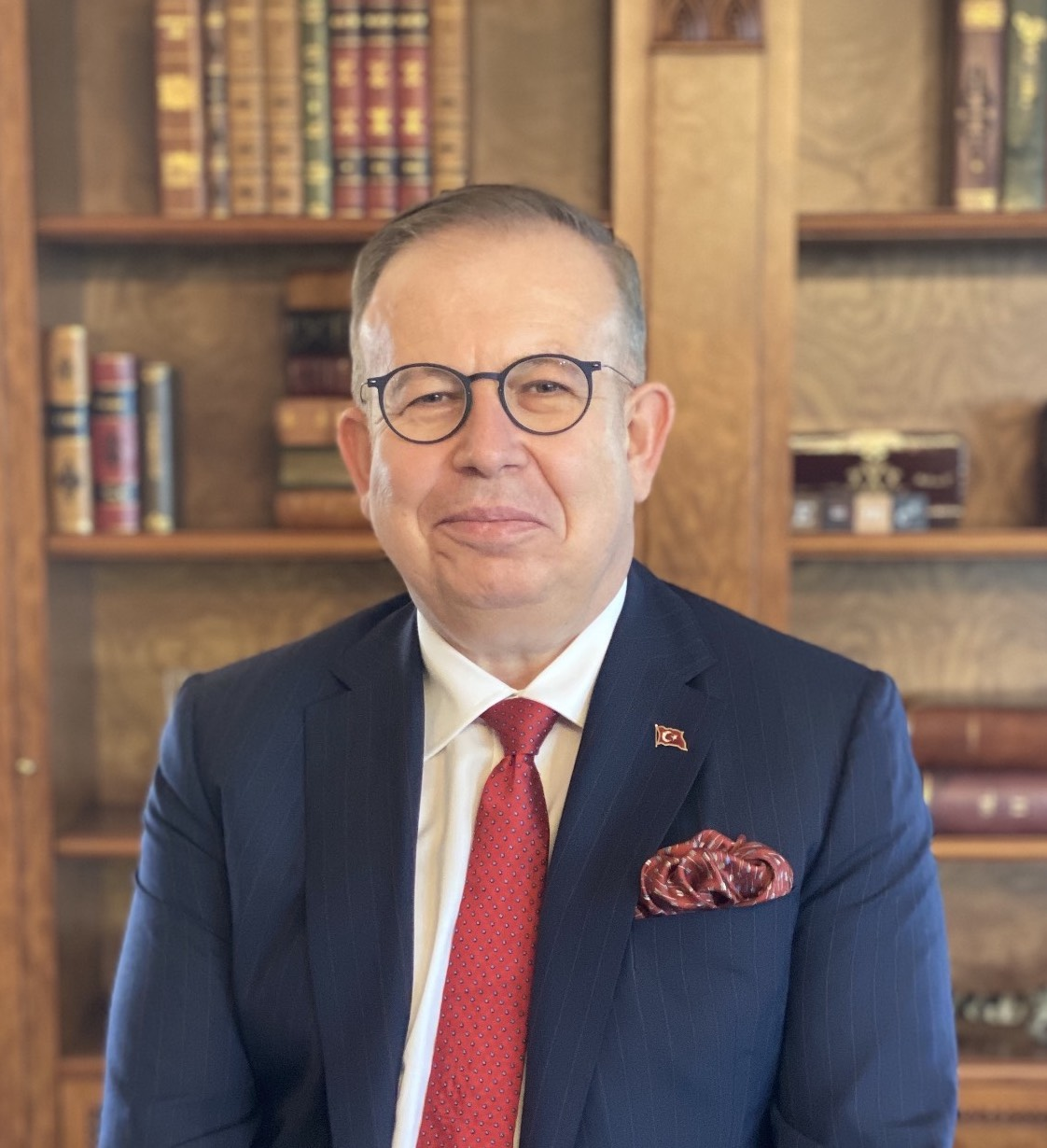
- Born: April 29, 1966 (age 59); Elazığ, Turkey
- Occupations: Officer, scholar
- Known for: "Blue Homeland"; an expansionist strategic–maritime doctrine (Note: See:.)
- Partner: Müşerref Yaycı
- Children: Baybars Yaycı

Cihat Yaycı (born on 29 April 1966 in Elazığ) is a Turkish author, former rear admiral, and theoretician of the irredentist and expansionist strategic–maritime doctrine known as "Blue Homeland".

== Education ==
Cihat Yaycı born in Elazığ in 1966, entered the Naval High School in 1984. In 1988, he finished Naval Academy and graduated from the Naval War Academy in 2000 and the Joint Warfare Institute in 2003. He received a master's degree in business human resources management in English from Marmara University, and physics engineering and electronic engineering from the Naval Postgraduate School (NPS) and completed his doctorate in international relations from İstanbul University.

== Career ==
Yaycı, worked as a branch officer and division chief on some ships under the Naval Forces Command, served as the commander of TCG Kemalreis between 2005 and 2006. After his duties as the second commander of TCG Yavuz and TCG Kemalreis. In 2011–2012, it became the 5th Destroyer Flotilla Commodore. Yaycı, who was promoted to Commodore on 30 August 2012, was appointed as Moscow military attaché in the same year. He assumed the duties of Southern Task Group Commander and Director of the Multinational Maritime Security Center of Excellence in 2014, and Commander of the Multinational Joint Warfare Center in 2015 and became rear admiral on 29 July 2016. Yaycı, who was appointed as the Personnel Head of the Naval Forces Command in the same year, was appointed as the Chief of Staff of the Naval Forces Command on 20 August 2017.

=== Resignation ===
On May 7, 2020, Cihat Yaycı was dismissed as the Chief of Staff of the Naval Forces Command and placed under the command of the General Staff with the decision of Turkish President Recep Tayyip Erdoğan published in the Official Gazette. Upon this, Yaycı stated in his resignation petition that "his honor was damaged" and that he could not perform his profession as an Admiral who was dismissed by a conspiracy, resigned from his post on 18 May 2020. He is currently the President of the Turk Maritime and Global Strategies Centre (Turk DEGS).

=== Works ===
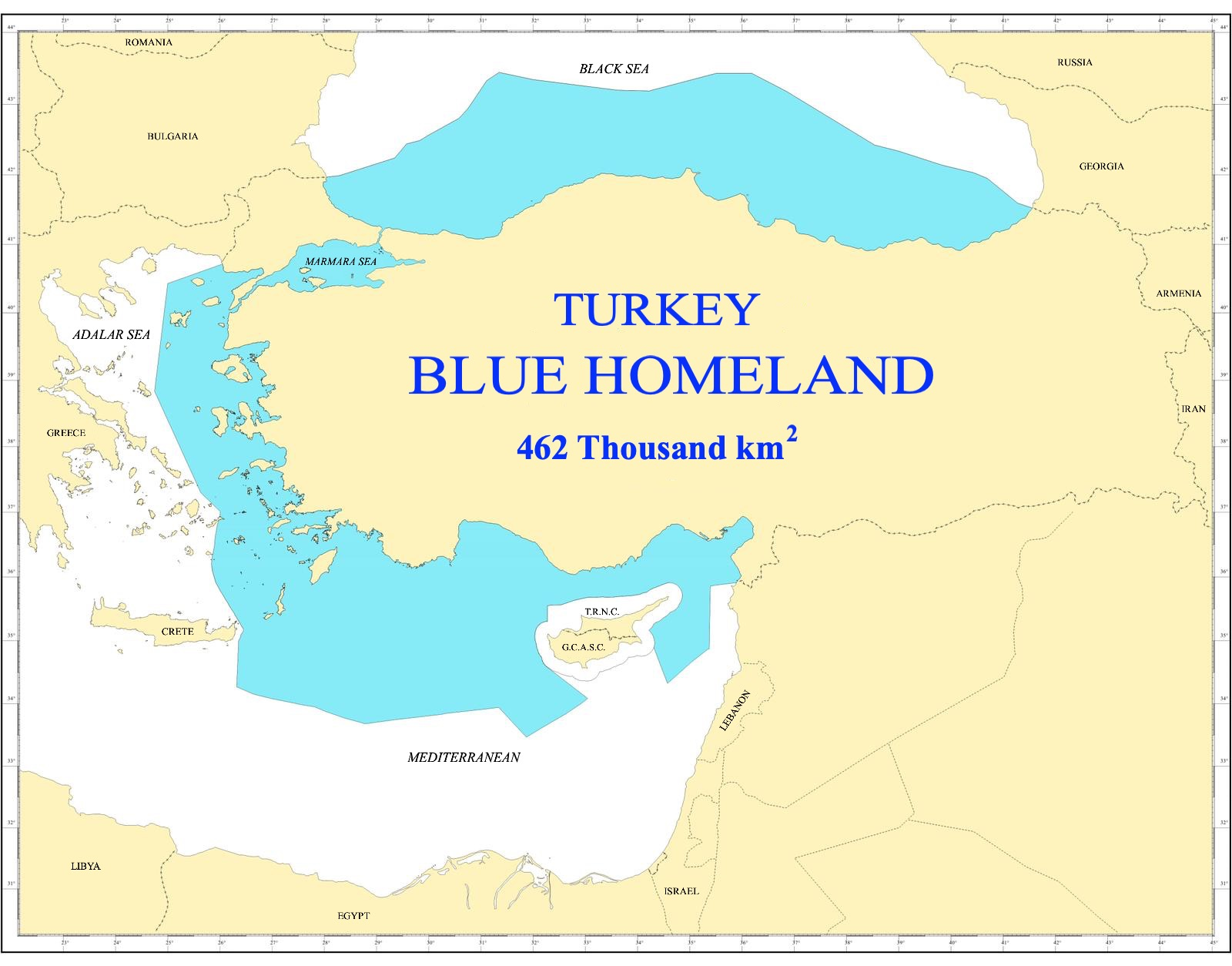
Depiction of the irredentist and expansionist "Blue Homeland" concept by Cihat Yaycı

Cihat Yaycı was involved in Libya-Turkey maritime deal and had developed a FETÖMETRE application with more than 350 criteria to determine the Gülen movement in the Turkish Armed Forces. With this application, he led to the discontinuation of about 4 thousand personnel of the Naval Forces Command.

Together with Cem Gürdeniz, Yaycı is known for contributing significantly to the irredentist and expansionist strategic doctrine known as "Blue Homeland". He wrote the main causes of the doctrine with his books Questions and Answers with Exclusive Economic Zone, Libya is Turkey's Neighbor from the Sea, Turkey and Sharing Struggle of the Eastern Mediterranean.

On 23 July 2020, Yaycı, suggested that the Aegean Sea is renamed to "Islands Sea" or "Northern Mediterranean" because Aegean is a Greek word.

== Books ==
List of Books Yaycı wrote:

- Orta Doğu'nun Önemi ve Irak'ta Yaşanan Savaşlar (1990–2003)
- Sorular ve Cevaplar ile Münhasır Ekonomik Bölge
- Libya Türkiye'nin Denizden Komşusudur
- Doğu Akdeniz'in Paylaşım Mücadelesi ve Türkiye
- Yunanistan Talepleri Ege Sorunları Soru ve Cevaplarla

== See also ==
- Aegean dispute
- Cyprus–Turkey maritime zones dispute
