= Demarcation dispute =

Dispute over which union members have the "right" to perform a task

A demarcation dispute may involve disagreement between trade unions, craft organisations or professional groups over which workers are to perform certain tasks or which trade union or organisations will represent a particular group of workers, especially in enterprises with multiple trade unionism or skilled trades. This is particularly important in compulsory arbitration systems of industrial relations, as in Australia, where only one union may be the registered representative of a particular classification of worker.
