= Alexandros Diakopoulos =

Hellenic Navy officer

- Born: October 11, 1962 (age 64); Athens, Greece
- Education: Hellenic Naval Academy; Harvard Kennedy School
- Military career
- Allegiance: Greece
- Branch: Hellenic Navy
- Service years: 1980–2020
- Rank: Vice Admiral
- Commands: National Defence Academy, Navy Training Command, Navy Academy, Fleet Supply Ship Promithefs, Minesweeper Aidon
- Known for: First National Security Advisor of Greece (2019–2020)

Vice Admiral Alexandros Diakopoulos (Greek: Αλέξανδρος Διακόπουλος) is a senior Hellenic Navy officer and in 2019–2020 the first National Security Advisor of Greece, in the Cabinet of Kyriakos Mitsotakis.

== Biography ==
Alexandros Diakopoulos was born in Athens on 11 October 1962. He is the son of lawyer and politician Georgios Diakopoulos (1929-2016), who served as Member of Parliament (MP) for Magnesia with the conservative New Democracy party. He entered the Hellenic Naval Academy in 1980, and graduated on 8 June 1984 as a line ensign.

He served in various frigates and fast attack craft, being promoted to Sub-Lieutenant on 3 June 1987, Lieutenant on 3 June 1991, and lieutenant commander on 28 June 1996. In 1990 he completed the helicopter pilot training course. He commanded the minesweeper Aidon in 1995–1997 and the Navy Helicopter School in 1998–2000. Promoted to Commander on 5 April 2001, he completed courses at the French Collège interarmées de Défense in 2001 and the Hellenic Navy War School in 2002, served as press officer of the Hellenic Navy General Staff in 2002–2005, as captain of the fleet supply ship Promithefs in 2006–2007, and as chief of staff of the Hellenic Navy Helicopter Command in 2007–2008. In 2006 he completed a Master in Public Administration at Harvard University's John F. Kennedy School of Government. Promoted to captain on 30 June 2008, he served as naval attache at Ankara until 2011, followed by command of the Navy Helicopter Command until 2013.

Promoted to commodore on 20 March 2013, he was head of the International Relations Directorate of the Hellenic National Defence General Staff until November 2014, when he was promoted to Deputy Director General of National Defence Policy and International Relations. On 16 October 2015 he was promoted to rear admiral and assumed command of the Navy Training Command. From 12 September 2016, he served in tandem as commander of the Navy Academy. He was promoted to vice admiral on 16 January 2017 and appointed as commander of the National Defence Academy. Until 8 March, he retained his previous posts as well.

On 1 August 2019, Prime Minister Kyriakos Mitsotakis announced the creation of the post of National Security Advisor to the Prime Minister, and the appointment of Vice Admiral Diakopoulos to the position. He resigned from his post on 19 August 2020 for undisclosed reasons but believed to be related to comments made public earlier. He resigned from his position on 19 August 2020, after public statements that confirmed that the Turkish research vessel Oruç Reis had carried out exploration activities in Greek waters. He was replaced by the Deputy National Security Advisor, the academic Thanos Dokos, on 14 October 2020.

Vice Admiral Diakopoulos speaks French and English, is married and has one child.

== Honours ==
- Grand Commander of the Order of the Phoenix
- Grand Commander of the Order of Honour
- Peacekeeping Participation Medal with Clasp
- Armenian medal for military cooperation
- Various Greek commemorative and long service medals
