= Thanos Dokos =

National Security Advisor of Greece

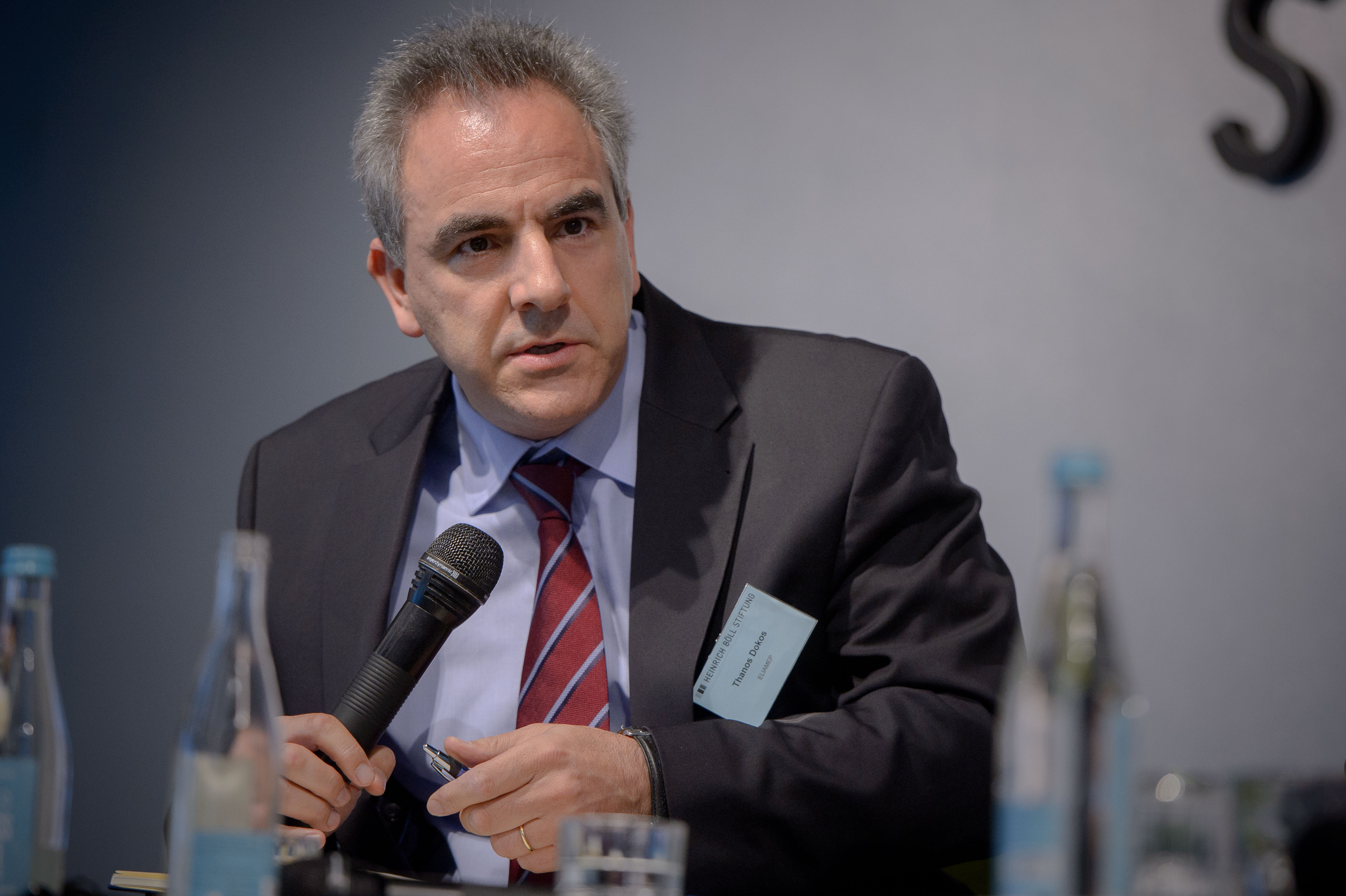
- Occupation: public official
- Known for: National Security Advisor of Greece (2020–present)

Academic background
- Education: University of Cambridge (PhD)

Academic work
- Discipline: International relations, strategic studies
- Institutions: Hellenic Foundation for European and Foreign Policy

Thanos Dokos (Greek: Θάνος Ντόκος) is a Greek scholar in international relations, who is serving since October 2020 as the second National Security Advisor of Greece, in the Cabinet of Kyriakos Mitsotakis.

== Biography ==
Thanos Dokos is a researcher specializing in international relations, having received a doctorate in international relations and strategic studies from Cambridge University. He has spent time as researcher at the Peace Research Institute Frankfurt and Harvard University's Belfer Center for Science and International Affairs, and taught in the universities of Athens and Piraeus, as well as Greece's National Defence School and Diplomatic Academy. In 1996–1998 he worked as scientific director of the Strategic Studies Directorate of the Ministry of National Defence, and in 1998–1999 as an advisor on relations with NATO at the Ministry of Foreign Affairs. He has also served as director of the Hellenic Foundation for European and Foreign Policy think tank.

In October 2019, he was appointed Deputy National Security Advisor, under Vice Admiral Alexandros Diakopoulos, in the Cabinet of Kyriakos Mitsotakis. After Diakopoulos' resignation in August 2020, Dokos succeeded him to the post on 14 October 2020.

In July 2026, he fell victim to Russian pranksters Vovan and Lexus. Claims by Greek officials that the pranksters used “highly advanced” artificial intelligence were denied by Vovan.
