= Neo-Ottomanism =

Reactionary ideology in Turkey glorifying the Ottoman Empire

Neo-Ottomanism (Turkish: Yeni Osmanlıcılık or neo-Osmanlıcılık) is a reactionary, revisionist, monarchist, Islamic nationalist, neo-fascist, conservative and Islamist political ideology in Turkey that discredits the Turkish secular nationalist republic and its reforms, and glorifies the Ottoman dynasty and its traditionalist establishments like the caliphate. It is also an irredentist and imperialist ideology that, in its broadest sense, advocates to honor the Ottoman past of Turkey and promotes the greater political engagement of the Republic of Turkey within regions formerly under the rule of the Ottoman Empire, the predecessor state that covered the territory of modern Turkey and the surrounding area.

Emerging in its modern form after the Cold War and acquiring greater ideological significance under the AKP, this ideology has combined appeals to Ottoman history, pan-Islamic and pan-Turkic identity, diplomatic engagement, economic investment, religious patronage, and cultural diplomacy. Since the 2010s, it has increasingly incorporated military intervention, coercive diplomacy, overseas deployments, and challenges to established regional arrangements. Those who characterize Turkey as an imperialist nation point to the international expansion of Turkish corporations, the foreign-policy interests of the Turkish ruling class, and Turkey's military expansion.

The term "neo-Ottomanism" has been associated with Turkish leader Erdoğan's irredentist, interventionist, Pan-Islamist and expansionist foreign policy in the Eastern Mediterranean and the neighboring Cyprus, Greece, Iraq, Syria, as well as in Africa, including Libya, and Nagorno-Karabakh. (Note: Multiple sources:) However, the term has been rejected by members of the Erdoğan government, such as the former Foreign Minister Ahmet Davutoğlu and the former Parliament Speaker Mustafa Şentop.

== Use of term ==
One of the first uses of the term was in a Chatham House paper by David Barchard in 1985, in which Barchard suggested that a "Neo-Ottoman option" might be a possible avenue for Turkey's future development. It seems also to have been used by the Greeks sometime after Turkey's invasion of Cyprus in 1974.

The term has also come to signify a domestic trend in Turkish politics in the 21st century, where the revival of Ottoman traditions and culture has been espoused by the Justice and Development Party (Turkish: Adalet ve Kalkınma Partisi, abbreviated AKP) which came to power in 2002. Under this banner, the AKP has challenged the secular and republican values officially recognized by modern Turkey after Kemalism. The AKP have used slogans such as Osmanlı torunu ("descendant of the Ottomans") to refer to their supporters and also their leader Recep Tayyip Erdoğan (who was elected President in 2014) during their election campaigns. Under this ideology, the AKP has attempted to transform Turkey's existing parliamentary system into a presidential system, favouring a strong centralised leadership similar to that of the Ottoman era. Critics have thus accused Erdoğan of acting like an "Ottoman sultan".

Beyond domestic policies, neo-Ottomanism has also affected Turkish foreign policy. Two doctrines espoused by the Turking ruling class that have been characterized as neo-Ottoman or imperialistic include the Blue Homeland and Ahmet Davutoğlu's "Strategic Depth" doctrine.

== History ==
=== Ottoman-era Imperialism ===
The Ottoman Empire was an imperial state that lasted from 1299 to 1922. At the height of its power under the reign of Suleiman the Magnificent, the Ottoman Empire was a powerful multinational, multilingual empire, which invaded and colonized much of Southeast Europe, the Middle East, Western Asia, the Caucasus, North Africa, and the Horn of Africa. At the beginning of the 17th century the empire contained 32 provinces and numerous vassal states. Following a long period of economic decline and military setbacks against European powers, the Ottoman Empire lost control of much of its territory in Europe and Africa. Neo-Ottomanist foreign policy encourages increased engagement in these regions as part of Turkey's growing regional influence./

=== Turkish Neo-imperialism ===
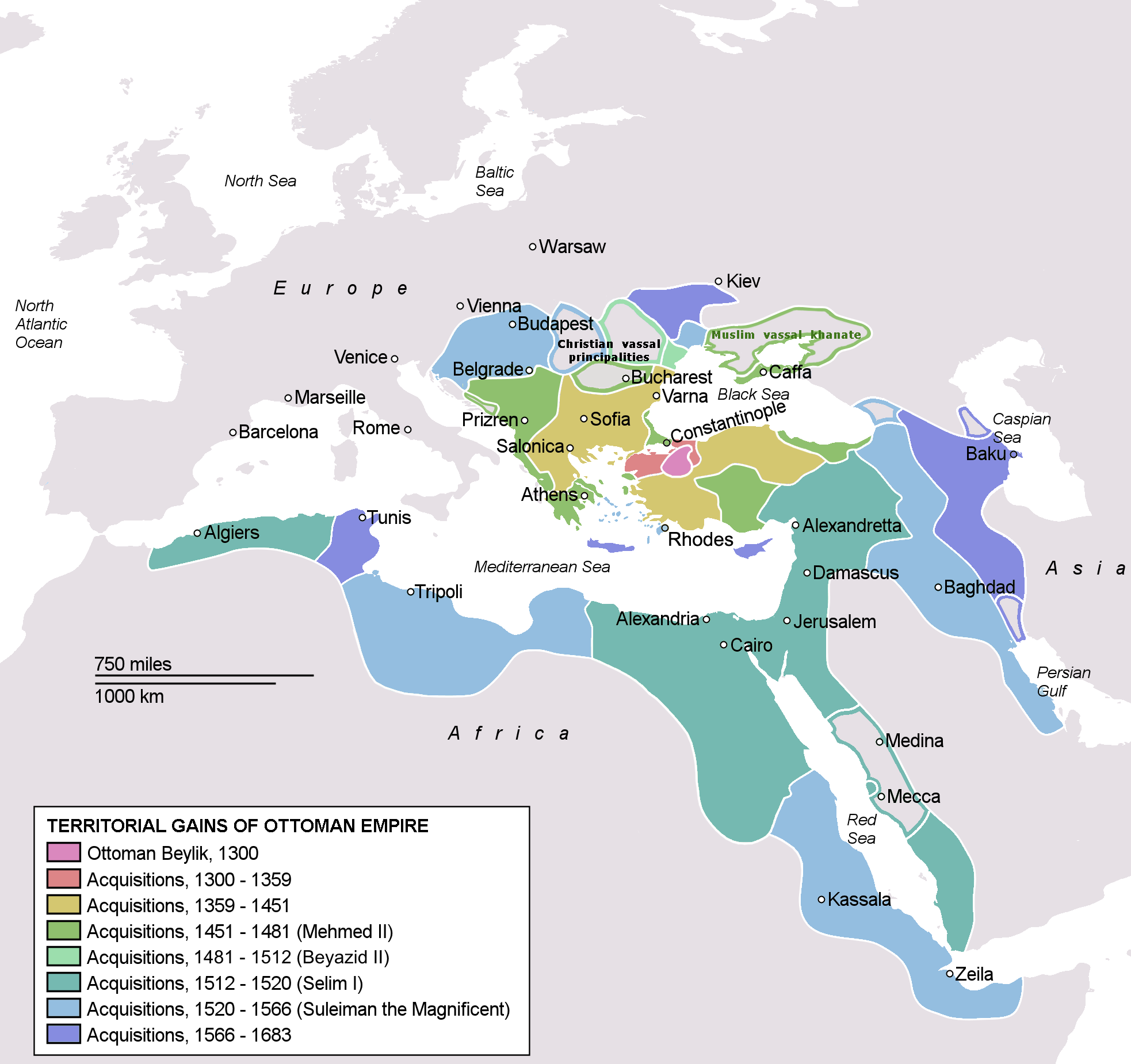
The extent of the Ottoman Empire in 1683

There have been two waves of this ideology: the first, in the early 1990s, developed by the Turkish journalist and foreign policy advisor to President Turgut Özal, Cengiz Çandar; the second, associated with Ahmet Davutoğlu, former Prime Minister of Turkey and founder of the Future Party. Davutoğlu's foreign policy goals include establishing Turkey as an influential power within the Balkans, Caucasia and the Middle East; however, Ahmet Davutoğlu rejected the term "neo-Ottomanism" to describe Turkish foreign policy. Davutoğlu described Turkey's foreign policy as "zero problems with neighbours" preferring "soft power" over overt military action. In contrast, as President, Erdoğan has overseen a revival of Ottoman tradition.

Neo-Ottomanism has been used to describe Turkish foreign policy under the Justice and Development Party which took power in 2002 under Erdoğan, who subsequently became Prime Minister. Neo-Ottomanism is a dramatic shift from the traditional Turkish foreign policy of the Kemalist ideology, which emphasized looking westward towards Europe. The shift away from this concept in Turkish foreign policy under Turgut Özal's government has been described as the first step towards neo-Ottomanism. Özal's neo-Ottomanism is characterized by a rediscovery of Turkey's multiple identities, in contrast to the unitary conception of the Kemalist republic, and by a tendency to prioritize economic aspects rather than politico-state and security logics.

Neo-Ottomanism had a basis in religious circles. Fethullah Gülen, an influential Islamic leader, looks both to personal transformation and social and political activism, and fully embraces Turkish nationalism—the defining characteristic of which is Islam, not nationality—and economic neoliberalism while stressing continuity with Turkey's Ottoman past. His emphasis on the role of the state and neoliberalism are legacies of the changing nature of the late Ottoman state from the vantage point of the east, including conflicts between Muslims and Christians in Yugoslavia and, later, the expansion of the Soviet Union and the threat it posed.

Turkey's new foreign policy started a debate, principally in the Western media, as to whether Turkey is undergoing an "axis shift"; in other words whether it is drifting away from the West and heading towards the Middle East and Asia. Such fears appear more frequently in Western media when Turkish tensions with Israel rise. Then-President Abdullah Gül dismissed claims that Turkey has shifted its foreign policy axis.

Focused on the rhetoric of the encounter between civilizations, Davutoğlu takes up the approach of former President Turgut Özal, who was the first Turkish president to begin discussions on Turkey's accession to the West. The latter put an end to the crisis that arose following the 1974 coup in Cyprus in order to move closer to the Western bloc, and thus to look towards Asia and extend its area of influence towards the countries of the Caucasus. Aiming at a policy of national harmony, Özal refuses any denial of specificity among Turkish citizens. He sought in particular to relaunch dialogue with the Kurds, wishing to put an end to the permanent state of war between the PKK and the Turkish state, a conflict which tarnished Turkey's image in the world.

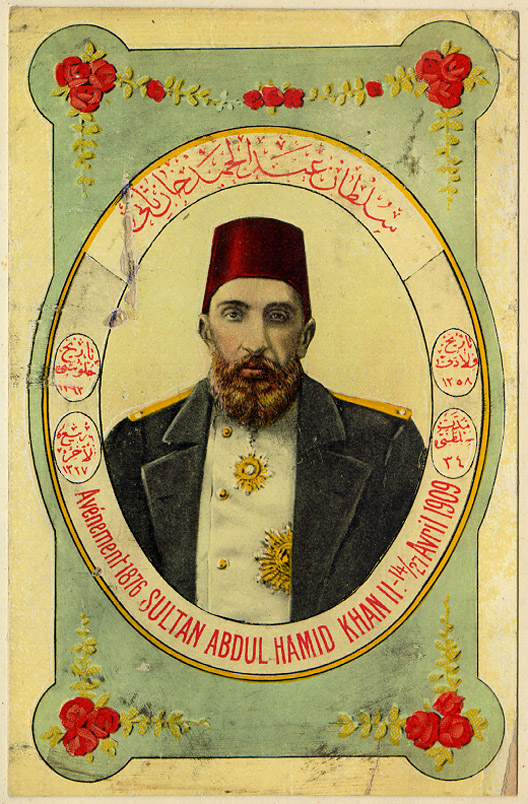
A cult of personality was developed around Sultan Abdul Hamid II to tarnish Mustafa Kemal Atatürk's established image as the founder of modern Turkey.

== State-sponsored glorification of the Ottoman dynasty ==
On August 26, 2020, Turkish President Recep Tayyip Erdoğan gave a speech, stating the following:

"in our civilization, conquest is not occupation or looting. It is establishing the dominance of the justice that Allah commanded in the region. First of all, our nation removed the oppression from the areas that it conquered. It established justice. This is why our civilization is one of conquest. Turkey will take what is its right in the Mediterranean Sea, in the Aegean Sea, and in the Black Sea."

— Recep Erdoğan

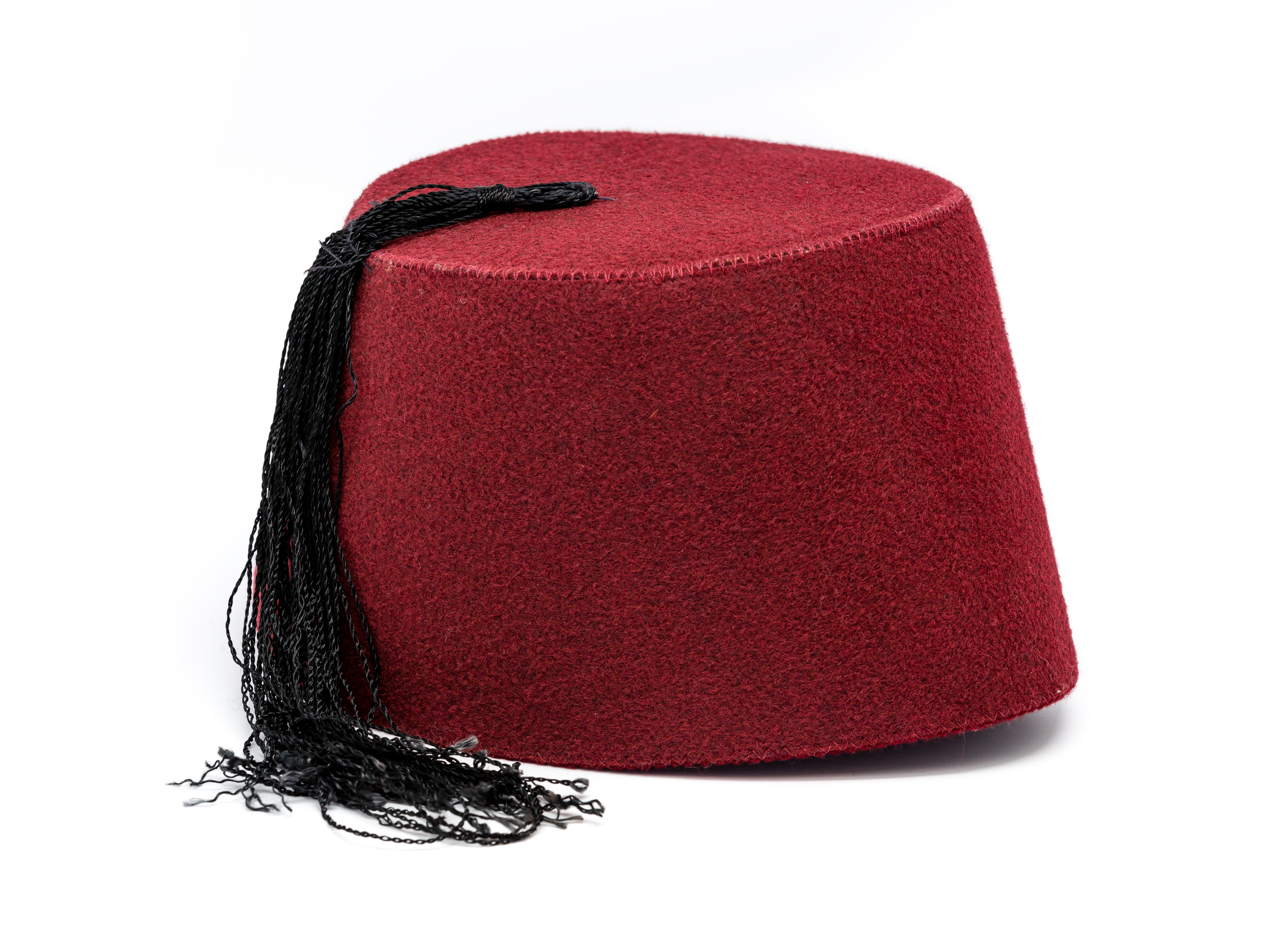
The fez, which entered public life in the Ottoman Empire as part of Mahmud II's Westernization reforms, became a symbol of Islamist anti-Kemalism in Turkey.

Many critics have accused Erdoğan of wanting to become an Ottoman sultan and abandon the secular and democratic credentials of the Republic. The American philosopher, Noam Chomsky, said that "Erdoğan in Turkey is basically trying to create something like the Ottoman Caliphate, with him as caliph, supreme leader, throwing his weight around all over the place, and destroying the remnants of democracy in Turkey at the same time".

When pressed on this issue in January 2015, Erdoğan rejected these claims and told TRT that he would aim to fill a role more similar to Queen Elizabeth II of the United Kingdom, explaining, "In my opinion, even the UK is a semi-presidency. And the dominant element is the Queen".

In July 2020, after the Council of State annulled the Cabinet's 1934 decision to establish the Hagia Sophia as museum and revoking the monument's status, Erdoğan ordered its reclassification as a mosque. The 1934 decree was ruled to be unlawful under both Ottoman and Turkish law as Hagia Sophia's waqf, endowed by Sultan Mehmed II, had designated the site a mosque; proponents of the decision argued the Hagia Sophia was the personal property of the sultan. This redesignation is controversial, invoking condemnation from the Turkish opposition, UNESCO, the World Council of Churches, the Holy See, and many other international leaders. In August 2020, he also signed the order that transferred the administration of The Chora to the Directorate of Religious Affairs to open it for worship as a mosque. Initially converted to a mosque by the Ottomans, the building had then been designated as a museum by the government since 1934.

While serving as the Prime Minister of Turkey, Erdoğan's AKP made references to the Ottoman era during election campaigns, such as calling their supporters "grandchildren of Ottomans" (Osmanlı torunu). This proved controversial, since it was perceived to be an open attack against the republican nature of modern Turkey founded by Mustafa Kemal Atatürk. In 2015, Erdoğan made a statement in which he endorsed the old Ottoman term külliye to refer to university campuses rather than the standard Turkish word kampüs..

== Imperialistic characterization ==
Contemporary Turkish neo-Ottomanism has been interpreted by a number of scholars as a form of regional imperialism that seeks to convert the historical, cultural, and political inheritance of the Ottoman Empire into renewed Turkish influence over neighbouring societies. Its geographical scope encompasses the Middle East, the Balkans, the Caucasus, the Eastern Mediterranean, and selected parts of Africa. Critics interpret these policies as efforts to reconstruct spheres of influence in which Turkey occupies a privileged position, sometimes at the expense of neighbouring states' autonomy.

Several scholars have interpreted neo-Ottomanism in relation to the development of capitalism in Turkey, the international expansion of Turkish corporations, and the foreign-policy interests of the Turkish ruling class. These interpretations emphasize economic and class relations alongside the historical, cultural, and religious dimensions of neo-Ottomanism.

=== Monopoly capital and financial interests ===
In On the Emergence of the New-Imperialist Countries (2017), Stefan Engel and his co-authors characterize Turkey as an emerging imperialist power. Their analysis traces the development of large Turkish capitalist conglomerates, including Koç Holding and OYAK, from the 1960s onward. They argue that the privatization of state-owned enterprises following the 1980 military coup promoted the merger of industrial, banking, and commercial capital, strengthening a domestic monopoly bourgeoisie. According multiple scholars, the development of major Turkish industrial enterprises and the expansion of Turkish monopolies beyond the domestic market provided an economic foundation for Turkey's growing regional ambitions. Özgür Öztürk specifically attributes Turkish foreign policy as being influenced by the international expansion of Turkish domestic finance capital: noting the integration of industrial, banking, and commercial capital within Turkey. In 2016 ten Turkish monopolies ranked among the world’s 2,000 largest.

=== International expansion of Turkish capital ===
The overseas expansion of Turkish corporations in foreign markets -- Middle East, Balkans, Central Asia, and Africa -- has been interpreted by multiple scholars as indicative of Turkey's emergence as a regional power. Turkish outward foreign direct-investment stock increased from approximately USD$ 1.2 billion in 1990 to 44.7 billion (USD$) in 2015. Overseas contracting revenues have also increased from $2.2 billion in 1986 to $30.7 billion in 2021. As of 2024, Turkish enterprises controlled 2,706 foreign affiliates generating $89.84 billion in annual turnover.

Key companies discussed in this context include Koç Holding's overseas production facilities, its joint ventures with Ford Motor Company and Fiat, and foreign energy investments by the Turkish Petroleum Corporation.

In Africa, Turkish businesses had invested approximately $600 million in Sudan, while Turkish companies operated strategic infrastructure in Somalia, including Mogadishu Port, alongside Turkey's expanding military and political presence. In October 2020, Somalia renewed the Turkish Albayrak Group's concession to operate and rehabilitate the Mogadishu Port for another 14 years, continuing an arrangement dating from 2013.

In the Balkans, infrastructure construction, banking, education, and industry are major sectors of Turkish investment. Çalışkan and Büyükgöze identifies Turkish construction projects in Senegal, Ethiopia, Iraq, and Libya, hydropower projects in Ghana, Albania, and Kosovo, and Turkish banking operations in the Balkans as examples of the state's wider "neo-imperialist aspirations".

=== Transnational capitalist interests and regional hegemony ===
Mehmet Şenalp conceptualizes neo-Ottomanism as an attempt to establish a regional hegemonic arrangement within the broader international neoliberal capitalist system.

Toni Alaranta identifies commercial interests as a major component of Turkey's African foreign policy. He argues that export-oriented businesses supporting the AKP have sought new overseas markets, while Turkish policymakers have invoked historical connections with the Ottoman Empire to strengthen diplomatic and economic relationships.

==== In relation to Europe ====
Mustafa Türkeş characterizes Turkey's attempted establishment of neo-Ottoman hegemony in the Balkans and Middle East as a project of regional imperial power, while Dursun-Ozkanca describes Ankara's efforts to exploit weaknesses in European Union engagement through economic investment, diplomatic influence, and cultural expansion in the Western Balkans before their accession to the EU. The Hague Centre for Strategic Studies documents Turkey's financing of imams in North Macedonia, funding of Islamic educational institutions across the Balkans, mediation between rival Muslim religious organizations in Serbia's Sandžak region, expansion of Turkish Maarif Foundation schools in Albania, and requests to revise historical textbooks portraying Ottoman rule as oppressive in Bulgaria. Peter van Ham warns that Turkey's combination of Islam, nationalism, and Ottoman imperialism could undermine European integration. Hüseyin Çiçek examines Turkish-Islamic organizations as instruments for influencing European diaspora communities, Scholars have argued that Turkey invokes historical grievances against Western imperialism to legitimize its own post-imperial ambitions, and present itself as neocolonial alternative to Africa. Alaranta describes Turkey's growing military involvement in Africa as part of an effort to increase its geopolitical influence. His study examines Turkish military deployments and security cooperation in Libya and Somalia, alongside commercial interests, diplomatic activity, and humanitarian assistance.

According to Engel and his co-authors, Turkey's former colonial dependence has evolved into a relationship of mutual economic and political influence with the West, reflecting its emergence as a regional imperialist power. The AKP government has exploited Turkey's strategic geopolitical position and rivalries between the United States, European Union, Russia, and China to advance its expansionist ambitions. During the 2015 European refugee crisis, Turkey used the movement of millions of refugees from Iraq and Syria as leverage to pressure European governments into accommodating its foreign-policy objectives.

=== Military expansion ===
Engel et al. connects Turkey's growing military-industrial sector with its regional ambitions. Their analysis describes the expansion of domestic arms production and international defence-industry partnerships, including cooperation between Turkey's BMC, Germany's Rheinmetall, and Malaysia's Etika Strategi. The multi-national joint venture called "Rheinmetall BMC Defense Industries Inc. (RBSS)" offers countries around the world military technologies. As of 2015 the armed forces of Qatar hold a 49% stage in one of the subsidiaries. Engel and co-authors interpret these developments as part of Turkish imperialist expansionism. The authors further identify the expansion of Turkey's military-industrial complex, citing annual arms-production growth of 21% since 2011 and a military that is ranked as the world's tenth-largest and NATO's second-largest. Sabri Ciftci argues that economic growth, the expansion of Turkey's defence industry, and an alliance between business interests and Islamists contributes to the government's growing military posture.

== Territorial Expansionism ==
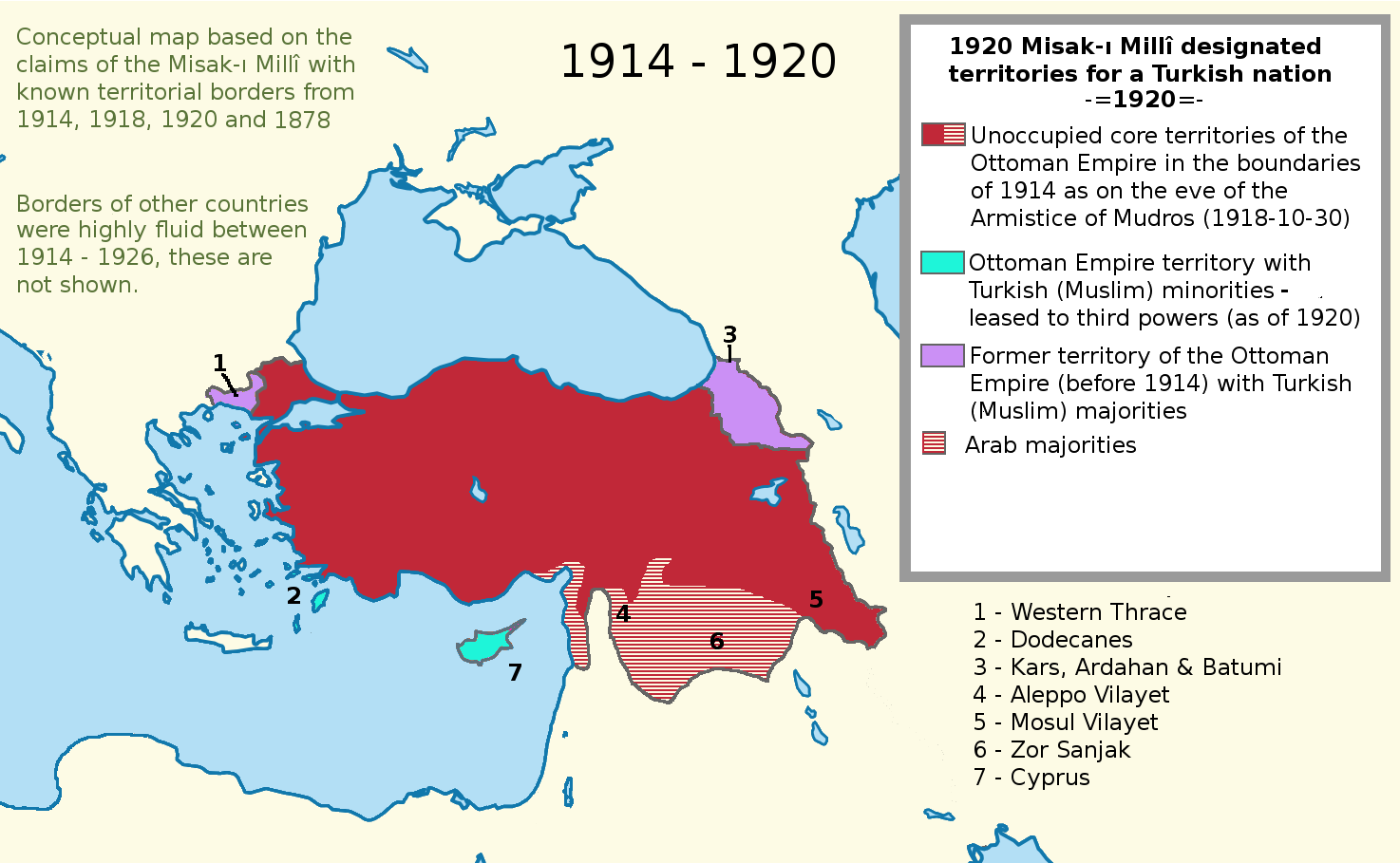
Turkey's borders according to the original National Pact (Misak-ı Millî). Some Turkish nationalists still claim these as the legitimate borders of modern-day Turkey.

Turkey has engaged or is currently engaged in territorial conflicts with its neighbours, including Greece, Syria, Iraq, and Cyprus. Turkish officials have also made irredentist statements regarding former Ottoman-controlled territories. In a 2016 speech, Turkish president Erdoğan mentioned the Georgian city Batumi in the context of Ankara's "heart and soul geography", while also asking: "Our physical boundaries are different from the boundaries of our heart...Is it possible to separate Rize from Batumi?".

Some Turkish nationalists still claim the territories specified in the National Pact during the Ottoman Parliament in 1920 and acknowledged by Mustafa Kemal later on.

=== Northern Syria ===
Several scholars and foreign-policy analysts characterize Turkey's military intervention in and occupation of Syria as examples of Turkish neo-ottoman imperialism aimed at gaining regional hegemony, suppressing autonomous local administrations and expanding Ankara's territorial influence. Beginning in 2016, Turkey pursued these objectives through successive military interventions, the occupation of northern Syrian territories, support for allied armed groups, and the establishment of Turkish-supervised administrative, economic, educational, and religious institutions. Erwin van Veen and Jan van Leeuwen argued that Turkey combined military occupation with systematic Turkification to consolidate its authority, restrict local self-government, and establish economically dependent territories under Turkish influence. Researchers have documented population displacement affecting non-Turkish minority communities, the restructuring of local governance, economic dependence on Turkey, and the extension of Turkish state institutions into Syrian territory. The overthrow of Bashar al-Assad in December 2024 subsequently created new opportunities for Turkish influence over Damascus.

=== Aegean dispute with Greece ===
Turkey's policies in the Aegean dispute have been characterized by scholars and foreign-policy analysts as neo-Ottoman or imperialist. This set of conflicts has strongly affected Greek-Turkish relations since the 1970s, and has twice led to crises coming close to the outbreak of military hostilities, in 1987 and in early 1996. The issues revolve around interpretations of the Treaty of Lausanne, relating to the delimitation of territorial waters and national airspace.

Political scientist Peter Seeberg links Turkey's Blue Homeland doctrine to Turkish Prime Minister Erdoğan's references to the Ottoman occupation of Greece and objections to the Treaty of Lausanne. Pavel Gudev argues that neo-Ottomanism and Pan-Turkism are used to justify expansive Turkish maritime claims. Mauro Bonavita describes Turkish demands concerning Aegean island sovereignty, demilitarization and disputed territorial status as accompanied by "nationalist, militarist and recently neo-Ottoman rhetoric,", arguing that Turkey has employed military pressure to obtain negotiating advantages. Omri Eilat interprets Turkish maritime policy as a longer-term effort to secure regional maritime control and prevent the application of the United Nations Convention on the Law of the Sea (UNCLOS). Dominique Marques de Souza likewise connects the Blue Homeland and neo-Ottoman doctrines to Turkish challenges to established maritime arrangements.

=== Georgian-Turkish relations ===
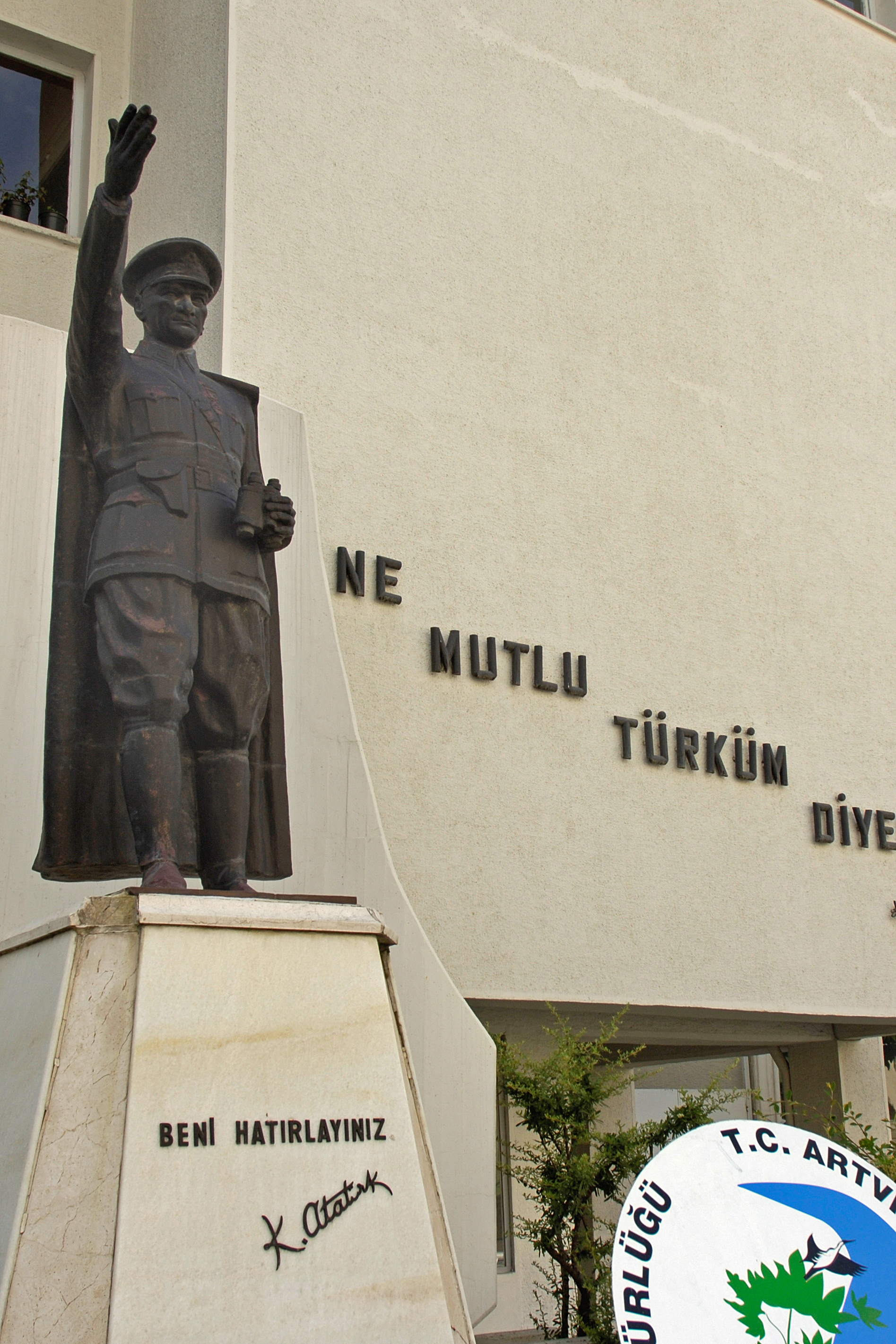
Atatürk monument in Artvin, captured during the 1921 Turkish invasion of Georgia. On the wall, it says, "How happy is the one who says I am a Turk"

Scholars have interpreted Turkey's expanding influence in Georgia, particularly under the Justice and Development Party (AKP) government since 2002, partly through the framework of neo-Ottomanism. Turkey has pursued this influence through investment, infrastructure, education, and religious institutions, particularly in Adjara, a former Ottoman territory where growing Turkish involvement has generated concerns about neo-Ottoman ambitions. Controversies over Turkish-sponsored Ottoman heritage projects, particularly the proposed restoration of the Aziziye Mosque in Batumi, have provoked opposition Georgian groups, while local Muslims have pursued independent mosque construction. Concerns have also been reinforced by President Recep Tayyip Erdoğan's historical irredentist references to Batumi and Turkey's unofficial contacts with Abkhazia. Researchers note that negative Georgian associations with Ottoman rule have limited Turkey's cultural influence.

Political economical critics, have criticized Turkey's involvement in Georgia as contributing to imperialism, economic dependency, resource extraction, and the expansion of capitalist interests at the expense of Georgian workers and local communities. Georgian left-wing scholars have particularly criticized the Namakhvani hydroelectric project, developed by a Turkish–Norwegian company, as an example of resource exploitation that transferred financial and environmental risks to the Georgian state while protecting private profits. The project's cancellation subsequently resulted in an international arbitration award of approximately US$383 million to ENKA, reinforcing criticism of the financial protections afforded to foreign investors. Other commentators have condemned Ankara's military assistance to Georgia, interpreting its provision of weapons and NATO-standard training as supporting Western geopolitical expansion and intensifying rivalry with Russia.

== See also ==
- Islamokemalism
- 16 Great Turkic Empires
- Blue Homeland
- Post-Kemalism
- Taksim (politics)
- Turkish invasion of Cyprus
- Turkish settlers in Northern Cyprus
- Turkish–Islamic nationalism
- Ulusalism
