= Projects of Common Interest =

- Formation: 2013
- Purpose: Infrastructure funding
- Headquarters: Brussels, Belgium, European Union
- Region served: European Union
- Key people: European Commission
- Website: Projects of Common Interest

Projects of Common Interest (PCIs) is a category of projects launched in 2013, which the European Commission has identified as a key priority to interconnect the energy infrastructure in the European Union. These projects are eligible to receive public funds. The PCI list is reviewed every two years. Since 2014, it is synoymously used with the term "Important Project of Common European Interest" (IPCEI) and includes innovation in microelectronics and communication technologies.

== Mission, history ==
In April 2013, the EU decided to codify "Projects of Common Interest" for cross-border energy projects, aiming to achieve EU energy policy and climate objectives. These are affordable, secure and sustainable energy for all its citizens, and its 2050 decarbonisation of the economy in accordance with the Paris Agreement. Major infrastructure facilities that connect energy networks across the union boost the use of renewables and ensure that clean, secure and affordable energy can reach all its citizens.

In June 2014 the EC introduced the term "Important Project of Common European Interest" (IPCEI) in the context of financial aid for the Projects of Common Interest. IPCEI has since been used synonymously with PCI.

In 2018, the EU announced funding the IPCEI for innovation in microelectronics and communication technologies with €1.75 billion, which was complemented in 2020 by the European Chips Act.

In 2020, the EU overhauled their regulation regarding trans European energy infrastructure (TEN-E policy), as part of the Trans-European Networks in light of the European Green Deal. It reworked criteria IPCEII, for example introducing intelligent gas networks, hydrogen and electrolysis of water projects.

== Eligibility process ==
A project must have a significant impact on energy markets and market integration in at least two EU states. It must also boost competition on energy market, help the EU's energy security by diversifying sources, contributing to slowing climate change and increasing the use of renewable energy. The PCI list completes the regulatory proposals of the Clean Energy Package with a clean infrastructure dimension.

== Process ==
PCI projects are first assessed to identify if they can effectively solve a need through infrastructure. Once they pass this test, they are assessed against the criteria set out in the TEN-E Regulation to identify how they contribute to the implementation of the respective energy infrastructure priority corridor. Projects meeting all requirements of the Regulation and making the largest contributions are proposed for inclusion in the Union list of Projects of Common Interest. The list is adopted by the European Commission and published in the Official Journal.

== Transparency and confidentiality ==
As part of the European Transparency Initiative, organisations should use the Register of interest representatives to provide the Commission and the public with information about their objectives, funding and structures. Contributions received from surveys and the identity of the contributors are published on the Commission's website, unless the contributor objects to publication of the personal information. In this scenario, the contribution will be published in an anonymous form. The protection of individuals with regard to the processing of personal data by the institutions is based on Regulation (EC) N° 45/2001 of the European Parliament and of the Council of 18 December 2000.

== Examples ==
In February 2023, the US chip manufacturer Wolfspeed announced it would build its first European factory in Germany. It is supposed to be on the site of a former coal plant in Ensdorf, Saarland with ZF Friedrichshafen as a coinvestor and susidized by the EU as an important project of common European interest (IPCEI) for Microelectronics and Communication Technologies.

== See also ==
- Connecting Europe Facility

== Sources ==
- European Infrastructure
- Current Major European Projects
- Projects of Common Interest - EU Interactive Map
- Examples of Projects of Common Interest and their benefits
