= Aphrodite gas field =

Offshore gas field of Cyprus

Aphrodite Gas Field
- Location within Eastern Mediterranean
- Country: Cyprus
- Region: Eastern Mediterranean
- Offshore/onshore: offshore
- Coordinates: 33°5′40″N 32°59′0″E
- Operators: Chevron Corporation Delek Drilling, Shell Oil Company

Field history
- Discovery: announced on 28 December 2011

Production
- Estimated gas in place: 7,000×10^{9} cu ft (200×10^{9} m^{3})
- Producing formations: Tamar sands

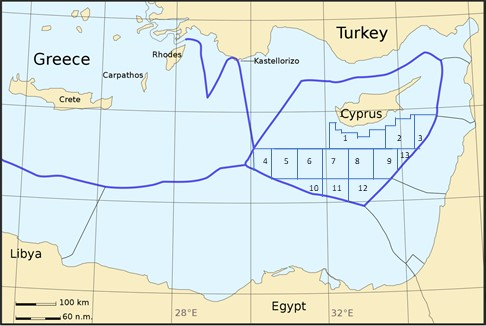

Aphrodite gas field is an offshore gas field off the southern coast of Cyprus located at the exploratory drilling block 12 in the country's maritime Exclusive Economic Zone and bordering the Yishai gas field, located in Israeli territorial waters. Located 34 kilometres (21 mi) west of Israel's Leviathan gas field, block 12 is believed to hold 3.6 to 6 trillion cubic feet (1.0×10^{11} to 1.7×10^{11} m^{3}) of natural gas. In 2014, the reserve estimate for the quantity of natural gas held by Aphrodite was raised by 12% due to new data received from the Yishai prospect as reported by Delek Drilling to the Israel Securities Authority. The cost of the field's development was estimated to range from $2.5 billion to $3.5 billion.

Noble Energy received the concession to explore block 12 in October 2008. In August 2011, Noble entered into a production-sharing agreement with the Cypriot government regarding the block's commercial development. Sources in Cyprus indicated in mid-September that Noble had commenced exploratory drilling of the block. The drilling, which took 116 days to complete, resulted in the finding of gas in high-quality Miocene sand intervals at the Aphrodite field.

In 2015, Noble Energy, Delek Drilling, and Avner Oil Exploration filed a Declaration of Commerciality of the field to be followed by a development and production plan. Noble Energy sold a 35% stake of Block 12, which includes Aphrodite, to BG for $165 million.

On May 7, 2023, in a first for the Aphrodite field, partners including Chevron Corporation and Shell plc began drilling an appraisal well. Drilling for natural gas in Aphrodite is expected at the earliest in 2027.

== Aphrodite-Yishai Dispute ==
The Aphrodite gas field has been the subject of a dispute between Cyprus and Israel since a part of the field, known as Yishai, stretches into Israel's maritime zone and gas being pumped from Aphrodite could reduce the amount of gas available on the Israeli side. Some estimates state that up to 10% of the total reservoir could be Israeli, making up to 10 BCM of gas worth nearly $1.5 billion at stake. In May 2018, Israeli Energy Minister Yuval Steinitz attended a meeting in Cyprus with Prime Minister Benjamin Netanyahu and said that the dispute could be settled within six months, but that if an understanding would not be reached, a professional arbiter would be asked to examine the findings from both sides and decide on the proper division.

In July 2018, development moved forward despite the dispute, which involved how to divide revenues between the Aphrodite and Yishai fields as well as OECD or EU rules should be used. The Aphrodite partners submitted a plan to the government of Cyprus to develop the field, to sell the gas to Cypriot users, and to export it to Egypt.

In November 2019, Delek Drilling, Noble Energy, and Shell signed a 25-year concession agreement with Cyprus for the exploitation of Aphrodite. In response, Israeli Energy Ministry Director General Udi Adiri sent a letter to the partner companies on November 24, 2019, saying that development must not begin until an agreement was reached between the governments of Israel and Cyprus. Cypriot Energy Minister Yiorgos Lakkotrypis responded to the letter by saying that the development of Aphrodite would continue as planned, that a procedure for a “special agreement” over unitization of the block was in progress and would be followed, and that there was no link between Aphrodite development and the procedure for the special agreement. Cyprus awarded a development license to the partners, who are to drill appraisal wells and conduct front-end engineering and design (FEED) work over the following two years, with a final investment decision anticipated for 2022. A commercial agreement is being sought to export up to 23 million cubic metres (800 million cubic feet) per day to Egypt via a pipeline that will be constructed as a separate project in which the gas from Aphrodite would be processed at the Shell-operate Idku facility and re-exported as LNG by 2025.

In March 2021, Israeli Energy Minister Yuval Steinitz met with Cypriot Energy Minister Natasa Pilides in Nicosia. The ministers agreed that the companies operating on the Cypriot side of the Aphrodite reservoir will start negotiations with the companies operating on the Israeli side (Yishai) in order to agree upon how the Israeli companies will be compensated for their share in the reservoir. They said that if the companies do not reach an agreement within 180 days, the dispute will be referred to an international expert who will try to resolve the issue within another 180 days. The agreement between the companies would in any case be subject to the approval of the respective governments. The two states also stipulated that they retain the rights to the gas reservoirs in their territory in compliance with international law as well as with their previous agreement.

In light of the 2022 Russian invasion of Ukraine, Pilides and Israeli minister Karine Elharrar announced in September 2022 that an agreement was near.

== See also ==
- Energy in Cyprus
- Cyprus–Turkey maritime zones dispute
- Lebanon-Cyprus maritime border agreement
