= Claudio Descalzi =

Italian businessman (born 1955)

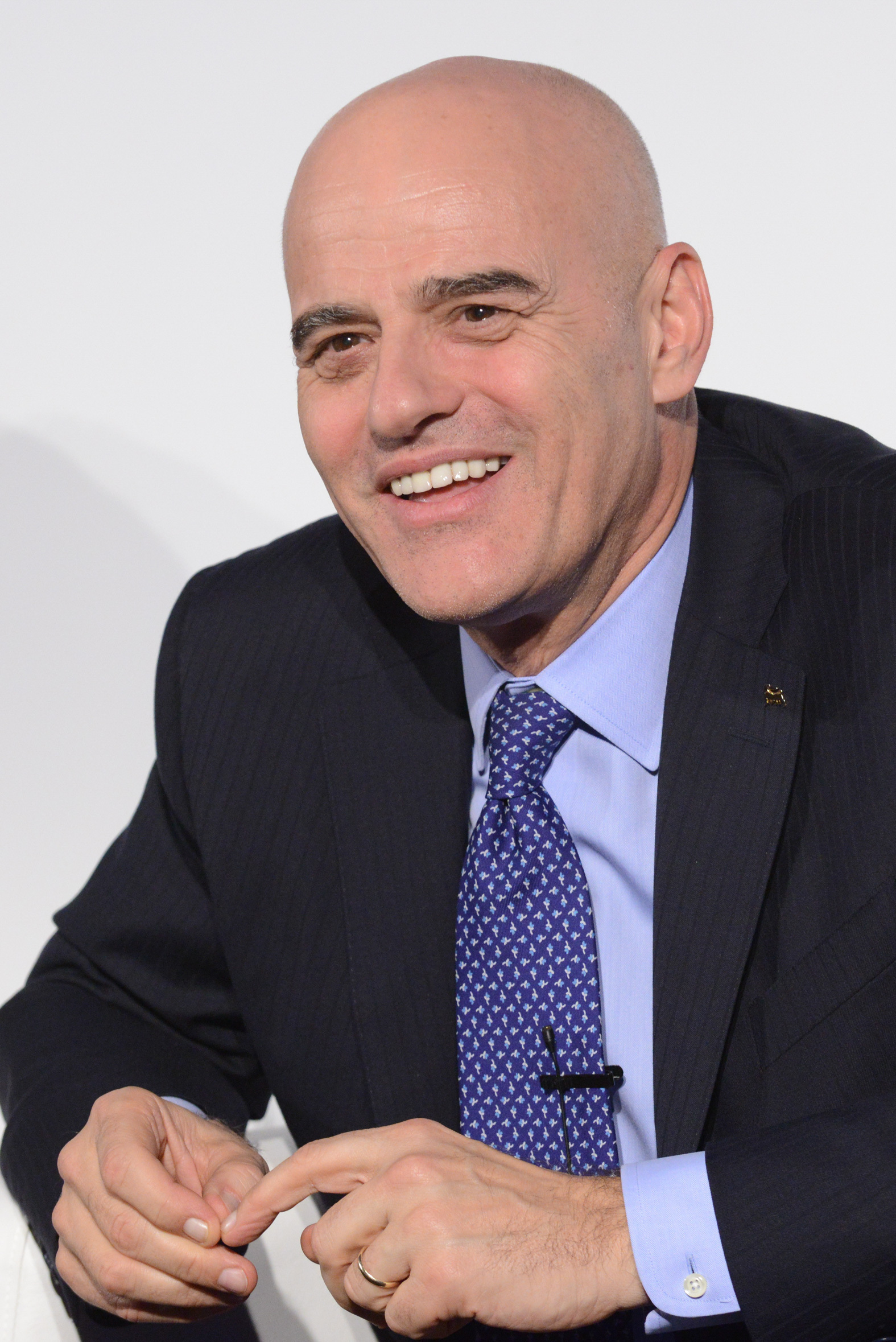
- Born: 27 February 1955 (age 71); Milan, Italy
- Education: University of Milan
- Occupation: Businessman
- Title: CEO, Eni
- Website: www.claudiodescalzi.com

Claudio Descalzi (born 27 February 1955) is an Italian businessman, and the CEO of Italian oil company Eni since May 2014.

== Education ==
Descalzi graduated in physics at the University of Milan in 1979.

== Career ==
Descalzi started to work at Eni in 1981, when he joined the multinational company operating in the production and distribution of energy as a reservoir engineer, then he became Project Manager for the activities in North Sea, Libya, Nigeria and Congo.

In 1990, Descalzi was appointed Head of Reservoir and operating activities for Eni Italy, a position which led him to develop a new model and to increase production to 250,000 barrels per day. From 1994 to 1998 He was Managing Director of Eni’s subsidiary in Congo, starting in 1997 the production in the Kitina offshore. In 1998 he became Vice President and Managing Director of NAOC: during this period He started the export of gas produced at the NLNG liquefaction plant and the development of deep-water offshore local projects.

Descalzi was appointed Executive Vice President for Eni Africa, Eni Middle East and Eni China in 2000 and he defined, launched and oversaw the start-up of the Eni Western Libyan, intended to increase the production of barrels per day in Libya from 85,000 to 280,000. From 2002 to 2005 he worked as Executive Vice President for Eni Italy, Eni Africa and Eni Middle East, covering at the same time the role of member of the board of several Eni subsidiaries. In 2005 he was appointed Deputy Chief Operating Officer of the Exploration & Production Division in Eni, a role he held until 2008.

Descalzi became in 2008 Chief Operating Officer of the Exploration & Production Division in Eni, giving his contribution to the definition of the strategic plan of upstream activities in Italy and abroad and starting important projects such as Goliat in Norway (2009), West Hub in Angola (2011) and campaign of exploration in Mozambique (2013). In 2014 he was appointed Chief Executive Officer of Eni.

During his first mandate (2014-2017), Eni's financial statements reported net profits of 3.37 billion euros for the year 2017. In 2016, he launched Progetto Italia, a program aimed at producing zero-emission energy. Under his leadership, Eni opened two photovoltaic plants in Assemini and Porto Torres, both located in Sardinia, the former in August 2018 and the latter in February 2020.

On March 18, 2017, Descalzi was confirmed as the managing director for a second term. In May of the same year, he announced the allocation of 21 billion euros in Italy for the next four years, with the objective of relaunching various sectors of the company. Since May 2018, Eni has been participating in the magnetic confinement fusion project of MIT and CFS. In September of the same year, Descalzi inaugurated the Gela biorefinery, an innovative plant designed for the production of biofuels. In November, Eni opened its first solar power plant in Pakistan.

On April 20, 2020, Descalzi was confirmed in his position for the third consecutive time. On February 19, 2021, he announced Eni's commitment to achieving the decarbonization of all Company's products and processes by 2050.

In September 2022, Descalzi met with Saudi Arabia’s Minister of Investment Khalid A. Al-Falih and signed an agreement aimed at promoting cooperation between Eni and Saudi Arabia.

On April 12, 2023, Descalzi was confirmed by the Meloni government as head of Eni for a fourth consecutive term, setting a record in the history of the six-legged dog company.In April 2026, he was further confirmed for a fifth term.

== Other activities ==
- President of Assomineraria (from 2006 to 2014)
- President of Eni UK (from 2010 to 2014)
- Council on Foreign Relations (CFR), Member of the Global Board of Advisors (since 2015)
- Board member of Fondazione Teatro alla Scala (since 2015)
- Member of the General Counsel and Advisory Board of Confindustria (since 2016)
- Member of the National Petroleum Council (in 2016 and 2017)
- Visiting Fellow of the University of Oxford
- Atlantic Council, Member of the International Advisory Board
- Co-Chair of the Oil and Gas Governors Community of the World Economic Forum (since 2025)

== Corruption charges ==
Descalzi and other Eni executive leadership have faced legal charges for corruption involving $1.1 billion, based on the company's operations in Nigeria and the Republic of the Congo.

In December 2016, Milan prosecutor's office closed the Eni / Nigeria investigation of international corruption by putting under investigation eleven suspects, including the CEO of Eni, Claudio Descalzi. On March 17, 2021, the Milan Court acquitted all the defendants involved in the investigation as there was no case to answer. Nigerian government stated that it is "disappointed" by the Milan court's ruling and "will continue to hold those responsible for the OPL 245 fraud accountable." On July 19, 2022, the Attorney General waived the appeal before the Second Section of the Court of Appeal of Milan, making the acquittal sentences pronounced in March 2021 definitive. On October 8, 2024, the Court of Brescia sentenced prosecutors Fabio De Pasquale and Sergio Spadaro to 8 months in prison in the Eni-Nigeria trial, on the grounds that they had omitted evidence favorable to the defendants, including Claudio Descalzi. On June 18, 2026, the Court of Cassation annulled the conviction without referral and acquitted De Pasquale and Spadaro, ruling that “the offence does not exist”.

For the Eni / Congo case, on February 8, 2023, the Milan Public Prosecutor's Office requested the dismissal of the proceeding.

== Honours ==
- 2012 – Charles F. Rand Memorial Gold Medal - Society of Petroleum Engineers (SPE) and American Institute of Mining Engineers (AIME). Claudio Descalzi was the very first European man to receive that prestigious international award.
- 2014 – He was nominated “Man of the year” by Staffetta quotidiana – An Italian magazine on petroleum.
- 2015 – He received the Corporate Social Responsibility Award by the Foreign Policy Association.
- 2016 – He was honoured with Laurea Honoris Causa in Environmental and Territorial Engineering at "Tor Vergata" University in Rome.
- 2022 – He was awarded with the Distinguished Business Leadership Award by Atlantic Council.
- 2025 – Knight of the Order of Merit for Labour.
- 2026 – Leonardo Prize.
