= Aegean dispute =

Controversies between Greece and Turkey

6 nautical miles (nmi): Current territorial waters recognized by Greece and Turkey, and airspace as recognized by Turkey

10 nmi: Current national airspace as established by Greece.

12 nmi: Extent of territorial waters and national airspace defined as a legal right by UNCLOS, to which Greece is a signatory and Turkey is not.

Map of the Aegean Sea

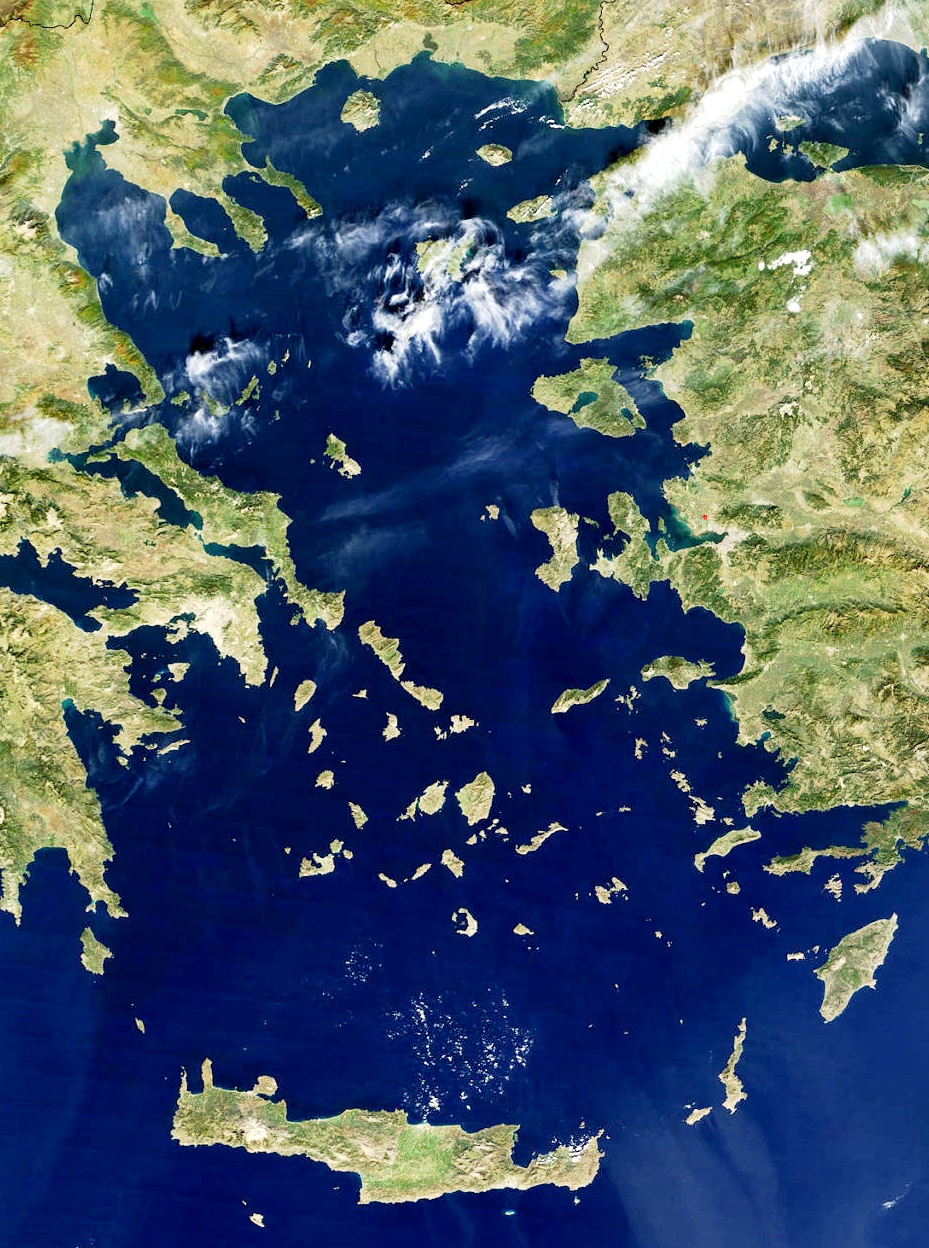
Satellite image of the Aegean Sea

The Aegean dispute is a set of interrelated controversies between Greece and Turkey over sovereignty and related rights in the region of the Aegean Sea. This set of conflicts has strongly affected Greek-Turkish relations since the 1970s, and has twice led to crises coming close to the outbreak of military hostilities, in 1987 and in early 1996. The issues in the Aegean fall into several categories:

- The delimitation of territorial waters
- The delimitation of national airspace
- The delimitation of exclusive economic zones (EEZ) and the use of the continental shelf
- The role of flight information regions (FIR) for the control of military flight activity
- The issue of the demilitarized status assigned to some of the Greek islands in the region
- Turkish claims of "grey zones" of undetermined sovereignty over a number of islets, most notably the islets of Imia

One aspect of the dispute is the differing interpretations of the maritime law: Turkey has not signed up to the Convention on the Continental Shelf nor the superseding United Nations Convention on the Law of the Sea, which as of July 2024 has been signed by 170 parties, including Greece; as such, Turkey does not recognize a legal continental shelf and EEZ around the Greek islands.

Between 1998 and the early 2010s, the two countries came closer to overcoming the tensions through a series of diplomatic measures, particularly with a view to easing Turkey's accession to the European Union. However, differences over suitable diplomatic paths to a substantial solution remained unresolved, and as of 2026 tensions remain.

== Maritime and aerial zones of influence ==
Several of the Aegean issues deal with the delimitation of both countries' zones of influence in the air and on the sea around their respective territories. These issues owe their virulence to a geographical peculiarity of the Aegean sea and its territories. While the mainland coasts of Greece and Turkey bordering the Aegean Sea on both sides represent roughly equal shares of its total coastline, the overwhelming number of the many Aegean islands belong to Greece. In particular, there is a chain of Greek islands lined up along the Turkish west coast (Lesbos, Chios, Samos, and the Dodecanese islands), some of them in very close proximity to the mainland. Their existence blocks Turkey from extending any of its zones of influence beyond a few nautical miles off its coastline. As the breadth of maritime and aerial zones of influence, such as the territorial waters and national airspace, are measured from the nearest territory of the state in question, including its islands, any possible extension of such zones would necessarily benefit Greece much more than Turkey proportionally.

According to a popular perception of these issues in the two countries, Turkey is concerned that Greece might be trying to extend its zones of influence to such a degree that it would turn the Aegean effectively into a "Greek lake". Conversely, Greece is concerned that Turkey might try to "occupy half of the Aegean", i.e. establish Turkish zones of influence towards the middle of the Aegean, beyond the chain of outlying Greek islands, turning these into a kind of exclave surrounded by Turkish waters, and thus cutting them off from their motherland.

=== Territorial waters ===
Territorial waters give the littoral state full control over air navigation in the airspace above, and partial control over shipping, although foreign ships (both civil and military) are normally guaranteed innocent passage through them. The standard width of territorial waters that countries are customarily entitled to has steadily increased in the course of the 20th century: from initially 3 nautical miles (5.6 km) at the beginning of the century, to 6 nautical miles (11 km), and currently 12 nautical miles (22 km). The current value has been enshrined in treaty law by the United Nations Convention on the Law of the Sea of 1982 (Art.3). In the Aegean, the territorial waters claimed by both sides are still at 6 miles. The possibility of an extension to 12 miles has fuelled Turkish concerns over a possible disproportionate increase in Greek-controlled space. Turkey has not become a member of the convention and does not consider itself bound by it. Turkey considers the convention as res inter alios acta, i.e. a treaty that can only be binding to the signing parties but not to others. Greece, which is a party to the convention, has stated that it reserves the right to apply this rule and extend its waters to 12 miles at some point in the future in the Aegean Sea (it has already done so in the Ionian Sea to the west). Greece holds that the 12-mile rule is not only treaty law but also customary law, as per the wide consensus established among the international community. Against this, Turkey argues that the special geographical properties of the Aegean Sea make a strict application of the 12-mile rule in this case illicit in the interest of equity. Turkey has itself applied the customary 12-mile limit to its coasts outside the Aegean.

Tensions over the 12-mile question ran highest between the two countries in the early 1990s, when the Law of the Sea was going to come into force. On 8 June 1995, the Turkish parliament officially declared that unilateral action by Greece would constitute a casus belli, i.e. reason to go to war. This declaration has been condemned by Greece as a violation of the Charter of the United Nations, which forbids "the threat or use of force against the territorial integrity or political independence of any state".

=== National airspace ===
National airspace is normally defined as the airspace covering a state's land territory and its adjacent territorial waters. National airspace gives the sovereign state a large degree of control over foreign air traffic. While civil aviation is normally allowed passage under international treaties, foreign military and other state aircraft (unlike military vessels in the territorial waters) do not have a right to free passage through another state's national airspace. The delimitation of national airspace claimed by Greece is the only example in the world, as it does not coincide with the boundary of the territorial waters. Greece claims 10 nautical miles (19 km) of airspace, as opposed to currently 6 miles of territorial waters. Since 1974, Turkey has refused to acknowledge the validity of the outer 4-mile belt of airspace that extends beyond the Greek territorial waters. Turkey cites the statutes of the International Civil Aviation Organization (ICAO) of 1948, as containing a binding definition that both zones must coincide. Against this, Greece argues that:

- its 10-nautical-mile (19 km) claim predates the ICAO statute, having been fixed in 1931, and that it was acknowledged by all its neighbours, including Turkey, before and after 1948, hence constituting an established right;
- its 10-mile claim can also be interpreted as just a partial, selective use of the much wider rights guaranteed by the Law of the Sea, namely the right to a 12-mile zone both in the air and on the water;
- Greek territorial waters are set at the 6-mile boundary only because of Turkey's casus belli.

The conflict over military flight activities has led to a practice of continuous tactical military provocations, with Turkish aircraft flying in the outer 4-mile zone of contentious airspace and Greek aircraft intercepting them. These encounters often lead to so-called "dog-fights", dangerous flight manoeuvres that have repeatedly ended in casualties on both sides. In one instance in 1996, it has been alleged that a Turkish plane was accidentally shot down by a Greek one.

=== Continental shelf ===
Conflicting claims to the continental shelf and EEZ areas in the eastern Mediterranean. Blue: areas claimed by Greece and Cyprus; red: areas claimed by Turkey. Section labelled "A-B": Claimed delimitation between Turkey and Libya as per November 2019 agreement. Section labelled "C-D": Delimitation agreed between Greece and Egypt as per August 2020 agreement.

In the context of the Aegean dispute, the term continental shelf refers to a littoral state's exclusive right to economic exploitation of resources on and under the sea-bed, for instance oil drilling, in an area adjacent to its territorial waters and extending into the High Seas. The width of the continental shelf is commonly defined for purposes of international law as not exceeding 200 nautical miles. Where the territories of two states lie closer opposite each other than double that distance, the division is made by the median line. The concept of the continental shelf is closely connected to that of an exclusive economic zone, which refers to a littoral state's control over fishery and similar rights. Both concepts were developed in international law from the middle of the 20th century and were codified in the United Nations Convention on the Law of the Sea in 1982.

The dispute between Turkey and Greece is to what degree the Greek islands off the Turkish coast should be taken into account for determining the Greek and Turkish economic zones. Turkey argues that the notion of "continental shelf", by its very definition, implies that distances should be measured from the continental mainland, claiming that the sea-bed of the Aegean geographically forms a natural prolongation of the Anatolian land mass. This would mean for Turkey to be entitled to economic zones up to the median line of the Aegean (leaving out, of course, the territorial waters around the Greek islands in its eastern half, which would remain as Greek exclaves.) Greece, on the other hand, claims that all islands must be taken into account on an equal basis. This would mean that Greece would gain the economic rights to almost the whole of the Aegean.

In this matter, Greece has the UN Law of the Sea on its side, but the same Convention restricts the application of this rule to islands of a notable size, as opposed to small uninhabitable islets and rocks. The precise delimitation of the economic zones is the only one of all the Aegean issues where Greece has officially acknowledged that Turkey has legitimate interests that might require some international process of arbitration or compromise between the two sides. Turkey cites the resolution of certain International Court of Justice cases like Territorial and Maritime Dispute (Nicaragua v. Colombia), Maritime Delimitation in the Black Sea case, Canada–France Maritime Boundary Case where court had used equitable approach and limited the continental shelves of islands.

Tensions over the continental shelf were particularly high during the mid-1970s and again the late 1980s, when it was believed that the Aegean Sea might hold rich oil reserves. Turkey at that time conducted exploratory oceanographic research missions in parts of the disputed area. These were perceived as a dangerous provocation by Greece, which led to a buildup of mutual military threats in 1976 and again in 1987.

=== Flight information regions ===
Unlike the issues described so far, the question of flight information regions (FIR) does not affect the two states' sovereignty rights in the narrow sense. A FIR is a zone of responsibility assigned to a state within the framework of the International Civil Aviation Organization (ICAO). It relates to the responsibility for regulating civil aviation. A FIR may stretch beyond the national airspace of a country, i.e. over areas of high seas, or in some cases even over the airspace of another country. It does not give the responsible state the right to prohibit flights by foreign aircraft; however, foreign aircraft are obliged to submit flight plans to the authorities administrating the FIR. Two separate disputes have arisen over flight control in the Aegean: the issue of a unilaterally proposed revision of the FIR demarcation, and the question of what rights and obligations arise from the FIR with respect to military as opposed to civil flights.

==== Demarcation ====
By virtue of an agreement signed in 1952, the whole airspace over the Aegean, up to the boundary of the national airspace of Turkey, has been assigned to Athens FIR, administered by Greece. Shortly after the Cyprus crisis of 1974, Turkey unilaterally attempted to change this arrangement, issuing a notice to airmen (NOTAM) stating that it would take over the administration of the eastern half of the Aegean airspace, including the national airspace of the Greek islands in that area. Greece responded with a declaration rejecting this move, and declaring the disputed zone unsafe for aviation due to the conflicting claims to authority. This led to some disruption in civil aviation in the area. Turkey later changed its stance, and since 1980 has returned to recognizing Athens FIR in its original demarcation. In practice, the FIR demarcation is currently no longer a disputed issue.

==== Turkish military overflights ====
As of 2009, the current controversy over the FIR relates to the question whether the Greek authorities have a right to oversee not only civil but also military flight activities in the international parts of the Aegean airspace. According to common international practice, military aircraft normally submit flight plans to FIR authorities when moving in international airspace, just like civil aircraft do. Turkey refuses to do so, citing the ICAO charter of 1948, which explicitly restricts the scope of its regulations to civil aircraft, arguing that therefore the practice of including military aircraft in the same system is optional. Greece, in contrast, argues that it is obligatory on the basis of later regulations of the ICAO, which it claims have given states the authority to issue more wide-reaching restrictions in the interest of civil aviation safety.

This disagreement has led to similar practical consequences as the issue of 6 versus 10 miles of national airspace, as Greece considers all Turkish military flights not registered with its FIR authorities as transgressions of international air traffic regulations, and routinely has its own air force jets intercepting the Turkish ones. In popular perception in Greece, the issue of Turkish flights in the international part of Athens FIR is often confused with that of the Turkish intrusions in the disputed outer 4-mile belt of Greek airspace. However, in careful official usage, Greek authorities and media distinguish between "violations" (παραβιάσεις) of the national airspace, and "transgressions" (παραβάσεις) of traffic regulations, i.e. of the FIR.

One of the routine interception maneuvers led to a fatal accident on 23 May 2006. Two Turkish F-16s and one reconnaissance F-4 were flying in the international airspace over the southern Aegean at 27,000 feet (8,200 m) without having submitted flight plans to the Greek FIR authorities. They were intercepted by two Greek F-16s off the coast of the Greek island Karpathos. During the ensuing mock dogfight, a Turkish F-16 and a Greek F-16 collided midair and subsequently crashed. The pilot of the Turkish plane survived the crash, but the Greek pilot died. The incident also highlighted another aspect of the FIR issue, a dispute over conflicting claims to responsibility for maritime search and rescue operations. The Turkish pilot reportedly refused to be rescued by the Greek forces that had been dispatched to the area. After the incident, both governments expressed an interest to revive an earlier plan of establishing a direct hotline between the air force commands of both countries in order to prevent escalation of similar situations in the future.

=== Timeline of incidents ===
Timeline of Armed Greco-Turkish Escalations
Date(s)	Summary	Casualties	Comments
18 June 1992	Dogfight between military jets	1 Greek death	A Greek Mirage F1CG crashed near the island of Agios Efstratios in the Northern Aegean, during a low-altitude dogfight with two Turkish F-16s. Greek pilot Nikolaos Sialmas was killed in the crash.
8 February 1995	Dogfight between military jets	1 Turkish wounded	A Turkish F-16C crashed into the sea after being intercepted by a Greek Mirage F1CG. The Turkish pilot Mustafa Yildirim ejected safely.
27 December 1995	Dogfight between military jets	1 Turkish death, 1 Turkish wounded	A pair of Greek F-16Cs intercepted a pair of Turkish F-4Es. During the dogfight that followed, one of the Turkish aircraft went into a steep dive and crashed into the sea, killing its pilot Altug Karaburun. The co-pilot Ogur Kilar managed to eject safely.
28–30 January 1996	Imia Crisis	3 Greek deaths (helicopter crash)	A brief military occupation took place on the island of Imia, corresponding with a military reaction from both sides.
8 October 1996	Dogfight between military jets	1 Turkish death	A pair of Greek Mirage 2000s intercepted a pair of Turkish F-16s (a single-seater C and a two-seater D) over the Aegean island of Chios. The F-16s were escorting 4 Turkish F-4Es on a simulated SEAD mission. After a long dogfight, one of the Turkish F-16s was allegedly shot down with a Magic II missile fired by a Greek Mirage 2000 piloted by Thanos Grivas. The Greek authorities said that the jet went down due to mechanical failure, while the Turkish Defense Ministry said, in 2014, that the jet had been shot down by the Greek pilot. Some Greek media outlets reported that it was an accident and the Turkish plane had unintentionally been shot down. Turkish pilot Nail Erdoğan was killed whereas back seater pilot Osman Çiçekli ejected safely. Greece officially offered to assist Turkey in its efforts to locate and salvage the Turkish fighter jet. In 2016, Turkish prosecutors have demanded two aggravated life sentences for the Greek pilot who allegedly downed the Turkish F-16 jet. The indictment demanded that Greek Mirage 2000 pilot Thanos Grivas be sentenced to two aggravated life sentences on charges of "voluntary manslaughter" and "actions for weakening the independence of the state." It also demanded another 12 years for "vandalizing the jet". Greece rejected the demands of the Turkish prosecutors.
23 May 2006	Collision of military jets	1 Greek death and 1 Turkish wounded	A Greek F-16 and a Turkish F-16 collided approximately 35 nautical miles south off the island of Rhodes, near the island of Karpathos during a Turkish reconnaissance flight involving two F-16Cs and a RF-4. Greek pilot Kostas Iliakis was killed, whereas the Turkish pilot Halil İbrahim Özdemir ejected and was rescued by a cargo ship.
16 February 2016	Denial of Greek PM in airspace	None	Turkey prevented the Greek PM's aircraft carrying the Greek PM and Greece's delegation from landing on the island of Rhodes for refuelling during their trip to Iran, arguing that the island is a demilitarized zone. Turkey also refused to accept the flight plan submitted by the Greeks, mentioned that the plane will not be allowed to enter Turkish airspace. Greeks created a new flight plan, the plane flew over Egypt, Cyprus, Jordan and Saudi Arabia so as to reach Iran, according to the new plan.
Near midnight, 12 February 2018	Littoral ramming	1 damaged Greek ship	The 1700 ton SG-703 Umut of the Turkish Coast Guard rammed into the 460 ton Stan Patrol OPV-090 Gavdos of the Hellenic Coast Guard. No injuries were reported but Gavdos received considerable damage to her port stern side. The incident took place in waters east of the disputed Imia/Kardak.
12 April 2018	Dogfight between military jets	1 Greek death	A Greek Air Force Mirage 2000-5 fighter jet crashed into the Aegean Sea, killing the pilot Capt. Giorgos Baltadoros, 33, as he returned from a mission to intercept Turkish aircraft that had violated Greek air space. The Hellenic Air Force lost contact with the Mirage jet at 12:15, while the aircraft was about 10 miles northeast of Skyros.
17 April 2018	Interception of Greek PM	None	Two Turkish fighter aircraft harassed the helicopter carrying Greek Prime Minister and the Greek Armed Forces Chief, as they were flying from the islet of Ro to Rhodes. The Turkish jets contacted the pilot of the Greek helicopter and asked for flight details. The Hellenic Air Force (HAF) responded by sending its own jets, which caused the Turkish fighters to leave.
25 March 2019	Interception of Greek PM	None	The Greek Prime Minister accused Turkey of harassing his helicopter while he was traveling to Agathonisi for the Greek independence day celebration. Turkey rejected the accusations, saying that the fighter jets were carrying out a routine mission.
18 April 2019	Interception of Greek general	None	Anadolu Agency wrote that after some foreign media claimed that Turkish fighter jets harassed the helicopter which was carrying the Greek army general during its travel to Kastelorizo, the Turkish army dismissed the claims saying that there was no approach that posed a danger to the Greek helicopter, adding that the aircraft belonging to the Turkish Air Forces were on regular duty in the Aegean.
March 2020	Littoral ramming	None	Greece summoned Turkey's ambassador to lodge a complaint after the Greek coastguard said one of its vessels had been rammed deliberately by a Turkish coastguard boat.
3 May 2020	Interception of Greek cabinet and ensuing dogfight	None	Greek officials said that two Turkish fighters harassed the helicopter which was transferring the Greek Defence Minister and the Greek Chief of the National Defence General Staff, after the helicopter took off from the island of Oinousses. In response 2 Mirage 2000s were sent to intercept the Turkish F-16s which was caught on video and released by the Hellenic air force. The Greek Ministry of Defence provided photos of the incident showing the Turkish aircraft.
14 August 2020	Mini collision of a Greek and Turkish ship	1 Turkish ship lightly damaged (denied by Turkish media)	In 2020 during the Oruc Reis survey in the eastern Mediterranean, the Greek frigate Limnos collided with the Kemalreis slightly damaging it. Several Turkish newspapers published a video showing Kemalreis was not damaged at the bow and that it continued with its mission in the Eastern Mediterranean.
23 August 2022	Alleged interception of Turkish jets	None	The Turkish Foreign Ministry claimed that Greek Air Force fighter jets placed radar locks on Turkish F-16s escorting US B-52 bombers as part of a NATO mission. These allegations were denied by Greece, while a Western military official noted that Turkey has yet to provide any evidence to support them.
6 January 2023	Littoral Interception	None	Greek coast guard fired warning shots at Turkish coast guard. Turkish coast guard alleges that Greek coast guard harassed Turkish fishing vessels.

== Recent developments: Turkey's claims and reactions ==
=== Blue Homeland ===
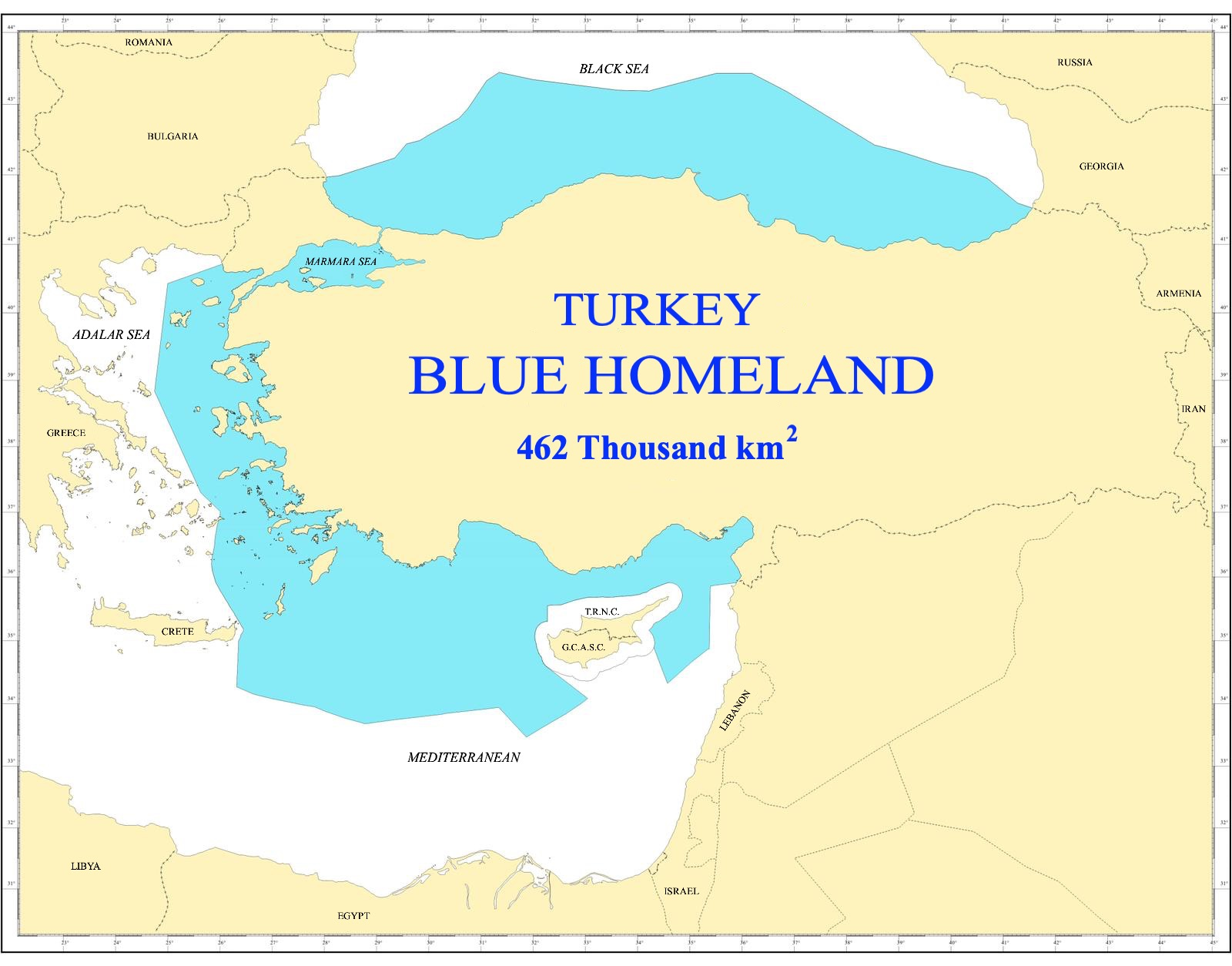
Depiction of the irredentist and expansionist "Blue Homeland" concept created by Cihat Yaycı

On 2 September 2019, Turkey's President Recep Tayyip Erdoğan appeared in a photograph with a map that depicted nearly half of the Aegean Sea and an area up to the eastern coast of Crete as belonging to Turkey. The map was displayed during an official ceremony at the National Defense University of Turkey in Istanbul and shows an area labelled as "Turkey's Blue Homeland" stretching up to the median line of the Aegean, enclosing the Greek islands in that part of the sea without any indication of the Greek territorial waters around them. The Blue Homeland is an irredentist and expansionist concept and doctrine, (Note: See:) compared to the German concept of Lebensraum; it was created by the Chief of Staff of the Turkish Navy Commander Cihat Yaycı, and developed with Admiral Cem Gurdeniz in 2006. The Greek side expressed its regret, with the Greek Foreign Minister Nikos Dendias stating that Turkey's tactics are "communication campaigns that cannot change international legitimacy, merely establishing Turkey's image as a perpetrator".

=== Lodging claims in UN ===
On 13 November 2019, Turkey submitted to the United Nations a series of claims to Exclusive Economic Zones in the Eastern Mediterranean that are in conflict with Greek claims to the same areas – including a sea zone extending west of the southeastern Aegean island of Rhodes and south of Crete. The Turkish claims were made in an official letter by Turkey's Permanent Representative to the UN Feridun Sinirlioglu, which reflect Ankara's notion of a "Blue Homeland" (Mavi Vatan). Greece condemned these claims as legally unfounded, incorrect and arbitrary, and an outright violation of Greece's sovereignty.

=== Turkey's view ===
Turkey holds the view, unlike most other states, that no islands can have a full Exclusive Economic Zone (EEZ) and should only be entitled to a 12 nautical mile reduced EEZ or no EEZ at all rather than the usual 200 miles that Turkey and every other country are entitled to. In this context, Turkey, for the first time on 1 December 2019, claimed that the Greek island of Kastellorizo shouldn't have any EEZ at all, because, from the equity-based Turkish viewpoint, it is a small island immediately across the Turkish mainland (which, according to Turkey, has the longest coastline), and isn't supposed to generate a maritime jurisdiction area four thousand times larger than its own surface. Furthermore, according to Turkey's Foreign Ministry, an EEZ has to be coextensive with the continental shelf, based on the relative lengths of adjacent coastlines and described any opposing views supporting the right of islands to their EEZ as "maximalist and uncompromising Greek and Greek Cypriot claims". On 20 January 2020, the Turkish President Erdogan challenged even the rights of Crete, Greece's largest island and 5th largest in the Mediterranean, stating that "They talk about a continental shelf around Crete. There is no continental shelf around the islands, there is no such thing, there, it is only sovereign waters."

Turkey's view, however, is a 'unique' interpretation not shared by any other country and not in accordance to the United Nations' Convention on the Law of the Sea (UNCLOS) treaty, which as of May 2022 has been signed by 168 parties (including Greece), but not Turkey. Turkey did not ratify the UNCLOS, and argues that it is not bound by its provisions that award islands maritime zones. The UNCLOS, and particularly Article 121 clearly states that the islands can have exclusive economic zones and continental shelf just like every other land territory. The Ambassadors of the United States and Russia to Athens, Geoffrey Pyatt and Andrey Maslov respectively, while commenting on Turkey's view, stated that all the islands have the same rights to EEZ and continental shelf as the mainlands do. The then US Assistant Secretary of State for European and Eurasian Affairs, Aaron Wess Mitchell, criticized the Turkish view on Cyprus's EEZ, stating that it "is a minority of one versus the rest of the world."

=== Turkey–GNA maritime agreement ===
On 28 November 2019, President Erdoğan signed a Memorandum of Understanding (MoU) in Istanbul with the Prime Minister of the Tripoli-based Government of National Accord of Libya (GNA), Fayez al-Sarraj, to demarcate maritime zones in the Eastern Mediterranean on an area between Turkey and Libya, appearing to "write [the Greek island of] Crete off the map entirely" in the words of Foreign Policy's Keith Johnson.

This agreement was controversial and drew condemnation by Greece and the international community, including the rival Tobruk-based government led by the Libyan House of Representatives and Khalifa Haftar, the European Union, United States, Russia, Egypt, Cyprus, Malta, France, Germany, Italy, Sweden, Serbia, Israel, Syria, Bahrain, Saudi Arabia, the United Arab Emirates and the Arab League, as a violation of the International Law of the Sea and the article 8 of the Skhirat Agreement which prohibits the Libyan Prime Minister from solely clinching international deals without consent of all the cabinet members. (Note: See:) The Libyan House of Representatives consequently started a bid to suspend the GNA from the Arab League, but did not succeed. The United States stated that it was "provocative" and a threat to the stability of the region. Acting foreign minister Israel Katz announced Israel's opposition to the maritime border accord between Ankara and Tripoli, and confirmed that the deal was "illegal" according to the Israeli official position, while at the same time noting that Israel does not want a conflict with Turkey.

On 18 October 2020, the German Federal Parliament (Bundestag)'s research service reviewed the Turkey-GNA maritime deal and found it to be illegal under international law, and detrimental to third parties.

==== Post-agreement developments ====
In response to these developments, the GNA Ambassador to Greece Mohamed Younis Menfi was summoned to the Greek Ministry of Foreign Affairs in Athens, where he was given an ultimatum of seven days, to disclose until 5 December the agreement his country signed with Turkey on maritime boundaries, or will be considered "persona non-grata" and be expelled from Greece. The authorities of the European Union also urged for the disclosure of the deal's details. Also, the Greek Prime Minister Kyriakos Mitsotakis met with the Turkish President on the sidelines of the 2019 London summit to discuss it. Greek Foreign Minister Dendias revealed in September 2019 that his GNA counterpart, foreign minister Mohamed Taher Siala had reassured the Greek side that Libya would never sign any illegal agreements with Turkey that would violate the Greek sovereign rights. On 6 December, the GNA Ambassador to Athens was expelled from Greece, prompting strong reactions in both the GNA and Turkey. Furthermore, the President of the Tobruk-based Libyan Parliament, Agila Saleh Issa Gwaider, who condemned and opposed the GNA-Turkey deal, was invited to Athens by the President of the Greek Parliament Konstantinos Tasoulas for talks.

Ankara asked for the agreement on maritime boundaries from the Government of National Accord (GNA) in the Libyan Civil War, in exchange for Turkey's long-time support against the rival Tobruk-based House of Representatives.

It is believed, according to multiple sources, that Turkey's President Recep Tayyip Erdogan is exploiting the weakness of the GNA headed by Fayez al-Sarraj to force it to sign "illegal" agreements which are a serious breach of international laws that disregards the lawful rights of other eastern Mediterranean countries; and that through these exploitations, Turkey is trying to assert its regional power and its control of the Mediterranean sea, at the expense of the rights of the other Mediterranean nations and undermining the peace-making efforts to resolve the Libyan Civil War and the curb of migrant influx to Europe.

On 4 December 2019, the Turkish Minister of Energy and Natural Resources, Fatih Dönmez, announced Turkey's intentions to start awarding licences to drills for natural gas in Greek waters which Ankara claimed through the Turkey-GNA deal, once it is approved by the two countries' parliaments. The same day, Turkish President Erdogan stated that he is "ready" to start negotiations with Athens for the delimitation of maritime borders between Turkey and Greece, under the condition that the negotiations are based on Turkey's peculiar perception which is stripping the Greek islands of their sovereign rights, and is violating the UNCLOS treaty. The intentions for drills in Greek waters, was confirmed by President Erdogan on a public broadcast of the Mavi Vatan map and the Turkey-GNA deal. On 5 December 2019, the Turkish Parliament ratified the contentious GNA-Turkey maritime borders deal, where it had a strong backing by four of Turkey's five major political parties - with the exception of the pro-Kurdish People's Democracy Party (HDP). The Libyan Parliament however blocked the ratification and rejected the deal unanimously, with the President of the Parliament, Aguila Saleh Issa, sending a letter to the United Nations declaring it as null and void. Even though the ratification by the Libyan Parliament failed, GNA deposited the maritime agreement to the United Nations on 27 December, with Turkey following on 2 March of the next year. On 14 July 2020, it is revealed that five countries sent a joint note verbale to the UN Secretariat calling for the agreement to not be registered and accepted, noting that, per UN procedures, its ratification by the Libyan Parliament is a prerequisite. On 1 October, the UN Secretary-General, Antonio Guterres, registered the Turkey-GNA deal on the delimitation of maritime jurisdiction areas in the Mediterranean. The agreement "has been registered with the Secretariat, in accordance with Article 102 of the Charter of the United Nations," said the certificate of registration. On 27 January 2021, a court of appeals in Al-Bayda ruled in favour of a lawsuit filed by the House of Representatives, declaring the Memorandum invalid.

According to multiple sources, there is a fear of destabilization in the East Mediterranean and NATO due to Turkey's assertive moves and that an armed conflict between Turkey and Greece draws closer. On 9 December, the vessels of the Libyan Navy which are under the control of the Libyan National Army, announced that they received mandate to sink any Turkish research vessels or drillships that may attempt to conduct researches south of Crete, as part of the Turkey-GNA deal. France also signaled its intention to send French frigates and ships to the south of Crete, in coordination with Athens, while Italy sent its frigate "Martinengo" to monitor, patrol and safeguard the sea around Cyprus, which has been the subject of claims by Turkey.

On 30 May 2020, the Turkish Petroleum Corporation (TPAO) applied to the Turkish Ministry of Energy for exploration permits on the Greek continental shelf, just 6 miles off Crete, Karpathos and Rhodes. TPAO's applications were published to the Turkey's Government Gazette, with a map showing the 24 blocks that Ankara has demarcated from Turkey's shores to the point where its claimed sea borders meet these of Libya, based on the Turkey-GNA maritime agreement. This prompted strong reactions both in Greece and abroad, with the Turkish Ambassador to Athens, Burak Özügergin, being summoned to the Greek Foreign Ministry, and the European Union's High Representative of Foreign Affairs, Josep Borrell warning Ankara that the good EU-Turkey relations "will depend critically on the respect of the sovereignty of Cyprus and Greece on the waters under dispute". Furthermore, the United States criticized Turkey, with the US Assistant Secretary of State for Energy Resources Francis R. Fannon stating, during a quadrilateral conference organized by both the American-Hellenic Chamber of Commerce and the Atlantic Council with the participation of USA, Greece, Israel and Cyprus, that such "provocative actions" must end and that the Turkey-GNA agreement "cannot as a legal matter affect the rights or obligations of third states" such as Greece.

=== EastMed Pipeline ===
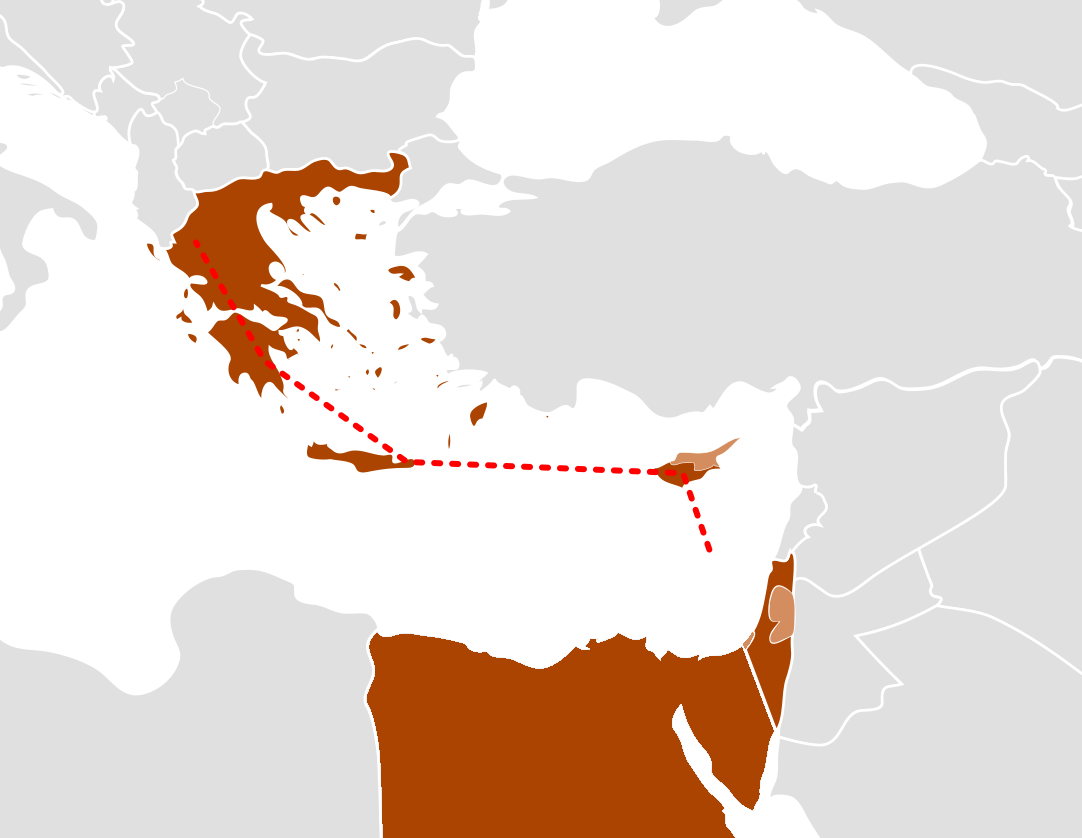
Map of the proposed EastMed pipeline

On 2 January 2020, the leaders of Greece, Cyprus, and Israel signed an accord to build the EastMed pipeline. The planned pipeline will transport natural gas from the Levantine Basin to Greece and from there to Italy and the rest of Europe. Energy expert Brenda Schaffer interprets the EastMed pipeline (forecasted to be able to cater to 10% of Europe's gas needs, and decrease reliance on Russia) as a joint attempt to exclude Turkey from the "Club Med" gas club, and the decision to sign the pipeline accord was taken in response to the Turkish-GNA deal.

On 19 May 2023, Claudio Descalzi, the CEO of Italian energy company Eni, said that any agreement for the construction of the EastMed pipeline must include Turkey; he added that "there are disputes between Turkey and Cyprus that are difficult to remedy, furthermore Turkey has made an agreement with Libya to define a very vast platform that covers almost the entire EastMed, therefore not only Turkey but also Libya will have a say." In response to these comments, George Papanastasiou, the Cypriot Minister of Energy, Commerce and Industry, stated that not all people agree with the opinions expressed by Descalzi, and that he respects his opinion. These remarks follow reports that Eni, Cyprus and Israel are working on a deal for constructing a natural gas pipeline in the Eastern Mediterranean, connecting both the Cypriot and Israeli offshore gas fields to a processing plant in Cyprus, where the gas will be liquefied for export by ship to Italy and the rest of Europe.

=== Greece–Italy EEZ agreement ===
On 9 June 2020, and in response to Turkey's moves in the region, Greece and Italy signed through their Foreign Ministers Nikos Dendias and Luigi Di Maio a "historic" agreement for the demarcation of the EEZ between the two countries. The agreement confirms the full rights of islands to their continental shelf and EEZ, in line with the UNCLOS. It uses the median line that was used for the 1977 Italy-Greece continental shelf demarcation agreement as the basis of the EEZ boundary. In the mutually agreed minor adjustments, part of the EEZ of the small Greek islands of Strofades, Othoni, and Mathraki was traded off for an equal area elsewhere (i.e. part of the EEZ of Italy's Calabria). According to Dendias, this creates an extremely favorable legal precedent for Greece in its dispute with Turkey. The United States, the Libyan House of Representatives, and the LNA led by Halifa Haftar, welcomed the EEZ agreement between Greece and Italy, with the US calling it "exemplary" and "an example of how these things should be done [in the region]", while reiterating their opposition to the Turkey-GNA EEZ agreement. Following the agreement, the Libyan House of Representatives sent an official invitation to the Hellenic Parliament for a similar EEZ agreement to be reached between Libya and Greece too, with talks beginning on 1 July. Dendias stated that Libyan-Greek talks are "not within the arbitrariness that so-called Sarraj-Turkey memorandum is constituting", but within the framework of UNCLOS and in continuation of the 2010 talks between the two countries. In this context, a committee of experts is formed by the President of the Libyan Parliament, Aguila Saleh. The LNA published a map with the proposed EEZ boundaries between Libya and Greece, in which Libya fully acknowledges the Greek islands' rights to their continental shelf and EEZ. Furthermore, on 18 June, a high-level delegation from Greece visited Egypt to negotiate and sign an agreement demarcating the Egyptian-Greek EEZ as well.

In July 2020, France and Austria have called for sanctions against Turkey, such as the termination of the Turkey's EU accession talks. In the same context the EU's Foreign Affairs Council convened and agreed for a framework of sanctions to be prepared for use in the event Turkey attempts any violations of Greece's sovereign rights. The Greek FM Dendias expressed his country's readiness to activate the Mutual Defence Clause (Article 42) of the EU's Lisbon Treaty for military assistance.

On 21 July, Turkey announced plans for a seismic survey south and east of the Greek island of Kastellorizo with the research vessel "Oruç Reis", and for this purpose it issued a NAVTEX covering parts of the Greek, Egyptian and Cypriot waters, prompting strong reactions both in Greece and abroad. The Greek embassy in Ankara sent a complaint to the Turkish Foreign Ministry, Egypt considers the move as an encroachment of its waters, and Germany's Foreign Minister Heiko Maas warned Turkey with consequences. Turkey dispatched its naval forces to the region around Kastellorizo, and Turkish armed jets conducted low overflights and dogfights with their Greek counterparts above the island, causing the tourists to evacuate it, and the Greek Armed Forces to be placed on high alert. The Turkish Ambassador to Berlin, Ali Kemal Aydın, was summoned to the German Foreign Ministry and the German Chancellor Angela Merkel held phone calls with the Greek Prime Minister Kyriakos Mitsotakis and the Turkish President Tayip Erdogan in a bid to de-escalate the situation. According to the German tabloid newspaper Bild, it was Merkel's last-minute intervention that prevented a crisis between Greece and Turkey. This was later confirmed by the German Defence Minister, Annegret Kramp-Karrenbauer. Along with Germany, France, Spain and the United States also backed Greece, with the French President Emmanuel Macron calling for sanctions against Turkey for the violation of Greece's sovereignty, the US envoy to Athens acknowledging Kastellorizo's "exactly the same" rights to EEZ and Continental Shelf as mainlands, and the State Department urging Turkey to halt its plans for surveys in the area around the island. A few days later, Turkey announced the suspension of its oil and gas exploration around Kastellorizo.

=== Greece–Egypt EEZ agreement ===
Several days later, on 6 August, the foreign ministers of Egypt and Greece, Sameh Shoukry and Nikos Dendias respectively, signed a maritime agreement partially demarcating the EEZs between the two countries, in line with the UNCLOS which recognizes the right of the islands to their continental shelf and EEZ. According to the Greek side, the Egyptian-Greek agreement cancels in practice the Turkish-GNA memorandum. Turkey opposed the agreement and considers it "null and void", claiming that "there is no mutual sea border between Egypt and Greece". Similarly, the Tripoli-based GNA government led by Al-Sarraj condemned it as a "violation of Libya's maritime rights". On the other hand, the Tobruk-based LNA government led by Haftar, Saudi Arabia and the United States, supported and welcomed it, with the LNA stating that Greece "should solidify a EEZ with the only democratically elected legislative body in Libya, the House of Representatives" and the US State Department stating that it encourages the peaceful settlement of disputes. Also, Manfred Weber, head of the European People's Party, the largest party in the European Parliament, welcomed the Egypt-Greece agreement as a positive development that "strengthens stability in the East Mediterranean," and urged for the European Union to "stand firmly with Greece" against what he called as Turkish attempts that "undermine international law in the region". In response to this, Turkey announced the next day that it resumed its seismic surveys south of Kastellorizo. Τhe US, the EU, France, Germany, Austria, Italy, North Macedonia, Egypt, Cyprus, Israel, the United Arab Emirates, Spain, Portugal, Malta, Sweden and Armenia expressed their opposition to Turkey's renewed explorations in the East Mediterranean, while Azerbaijan counteracted to Armenia's position by lending its support for Turkey's moves. On 14 August 2020, Greece's and Turkey's ships collided and suffered minor damages and France intervened by sending its naval forces to the East Mediterranean, to Greece's aid, followed by the United Arab Emirates whose Fighter Jets are stationed at the Souda Bay Naval Base, in Crete. Also, the United States beefed up their military presence in the East Med by assigning the USS Hershel "Woody" Williams to the Souda Bay as its new permanent home, and talks on moving US assets from the Incirlik Air Base in Turkey, to Souda Bay opened. Josep Borrell announced that the European Union is preparing a list of sanctions against Turkey, including tough economic measures, and the former Turkish Prime Minister Ahmet Davutoglu criticized openly his own country's "power projection" in the East Mediterranean, which, according to him, risks causing a military conflict. On 18 August, the Egyptian Parliament ratified the Greece - Egypt EEZ Agreement and, 9 days later, the Greek Parliament followed suit, before it would be registered at the United Nations on 24 December 2020. Greece announced that reaching EEZ agreements with Albania and Cyprus are among its next priorities. On 17 September, the European Parliament condemned Turkey for its violations of the Greek and Cypriot EEZs and called on the European Council to prepare further sanctions.

Due to Turkey's diplomatic isolation, and just a week ahead of the EU Summit where sanctions against the EU-candidate country for its drilling activities were to be evaluated, Oruç Reis withdrew from Kastellorizo and the Turkish surveys on Greek continental shelf were halted. Turkey agreed to resort to diplomatic means for resolving its maritime disputes with Greece. Turkey's economy is dependent on foreign markets and especially the European Union, for exports, imports, short-term finance and technology, and thus, the EU's tough economic sanctions could have a "fatal" impact on the Turkish economy and the Turkish President Erdogan's political survival. The prospect of EU sanctions also have contributed to the Turkish Lira's depreciation to record-low levels, worsening its economy. The United States, which criticized Turkey's assertive policies in the region, welcomed Ankara's decision to adopt a more diplomatic stance over its maritime dispute with Greece, with the head of the American foreign policy, Secretary of State Michael R. Pompeo stating that "the way conflict is resolved is not through shows of force, it's not through demonstrations of power, it's through dialogue. It's through international systems, agreement, conversations, dialogue. That's how these maritime disputes ought to be resolved. We've watched the Greeks move in that direction trying to achieve that. We hope the Turkish Government will see it the same way". Additionally, Pompeo sided with Greece, by asking for a solution that is "reflective of the fundamental rights of the citizens of Greece".

=== 2020–2021 developments ===
On 8 October 2020, Turkey and Greece agreed, under Germany's mediation and with the United States' full consultation, to resume exploratory talks for resolving their maritime disputes. However, a few days later, on 11 October, Turkey withdrew from the talks and resumed its gunboat diplomacy by releasing a NAVTEX announcing that it will be conducting surveys on the waters just 6.5 nautical miles off Kastellorizo and redeployed its research vessel Oruç Reis, escorted by Turkish frigates, for this purpose. These Turkish moves drew the International community's condemnation, with Berlin decrying them as a "serious blow" to efforts at easing tensions in the East Mediterranean and accusing Ankara for "interplay between detente and provocation", the German Foreign Minister Heiko Maas cancelling his planned official visit to Ankara, and along with France, warning Turkey with consequences, Greece's Foreign Minister Nikos Dendias declaring that "the Turkish leadership has shown it is not a credible interlocutor. Its calls for dialogue are only a pretext. The international community must judge [Ankara] on the basis of actions, not words. We must all face reality before it is too late", the United States "deploring" Ankara for its moves, which the State Department described as "calculated provocations", Austria's Chancellor Sebastian Kurz condemning Oruc Reis' redeployment and warning Turkey of sanctions, Egypt's Foreign Minister Sameh Shoukry rejecting Turkey's gunboat diplomacy and policy of territorial expansion in the region, Sweden's Foreign Minister Ann Linde warning that the Oruç Reis' redeployment is leading to new tensions instead of contributing to de-escalation, Israel expressing its concerns over Turkey's destabilizing role in the East Med, and Russia backing Greece's right to expand its territorial waters to 12 nautical miles and reaffirming that the UNCLOS is a "cornerstone" of the international law and applies to the Mediterranean Sea. Manfred Weber of the EPP reiterated his call for EU sanctions against Turkey, stating that these initial de-escalation moves by Erdogan were purposeful only, with the aim of avoiding sanctions against his country at the recent European Council. Turkey however rebuffed international criticism of its research vessel's redeployment, insisting that the Oruç Reis is operating in what it claims as "Turkish waters".

On 17 October, Turkey passed a law expanding its search and rescue (SAR) area to cover all the new territories it claims in the Aegean and Mediterranean seas as part of its Blue Homeland theory. Greece condemned this extension of Turkish SAR as illegal under international law which does not permit any deliberate expansions of SAR areas without prior agreements with the relevant neighboring states, and protested strongly due to this expansion overlapping with Greece's Athens SAR and the sovereign rights of Greek islands and their surrounding waters. The Greek Ministry of Foreign Affairs filed a complaint against it at the International Civil Aviation Organization (ICAO) and the International Maritime Organization (IMO). Turkey described the Greek protests as "groundless", insisting that the expansion was done "to ensure the safety of the activities" within the Greek continental shelf which Ankara claims as "Turkish". ICAO's Secretary General Fang Liu, however, responded by rejecting Turkey's unilateral expansion of SAR and reaffirming the Greek position on the matter. According to Liu, no changes may be done to the SAR boundaries between the two countries without Greece's prior consent.

On 20 October, Greece and Albania agreed to resume negotiations for the demarcation of their maritime boundaries and that, in the event of no resolution, the two parties may jointly submit the case to the International Court of Justice in The Hague. The two countries had already reached an agreement on the demarcation of their maritime boundaries in 2009. Although ratified by the Greek side, the Albanian one took it to the Albanian Supreme Court where it was deemed unconstitutional. According to Cihat Yaycı, a Turkish general and author of the Turkey's "Blue Homeland" theory, it was due to Ankara's pressure on Tirana that the agreement's ratification failed. For Turkey, an agreement between Albania and Greece based on the UNCLOS, would have had set a negative legal precedent against Turkey's positions in its maritime disputes with Greece. According to US diplomatic cables leaked in 2011, however, the Greek government had blackmailed Albania to accept an unfavourable deal using the veto power that Athens has over EU enlargement.

On 18 November, Greece and the United Arab Emirates formed a military alliance by signing a mutual defense pact, which calls for each to help the other in case of an attack. The pact which is regarded as historic, marking the first of its kind in Greece's modern history, aims at countering Turkey's policies in the region.

Turkey was criticized at a NATO meeting on 3 December by the then US Secretary of State Mike Pompeo, for what he regarded as undermining NATO's security and cohesion and destabilizing the eastern Mediterranean by stoking tensions with fellow ally Greece, whilst according to Reuters, Turkish sources with knowledge of the meeting saw Pompeo's approach as "unjust" as Turkey was "open to talks with Greece". On 5 December, Turkey's Ministry of Foreign Affairs tweeted that "No sanctions will ever make Turkey compromise its sovereign rights, be it in Meis/Kastellorizo or 10 nm airspace." On 9 December, the US House of Representatives adopted the National Defence Authorization Act (NDAA), a defense legislation which includes sanctionary measures against Turkey because of several international disagreements between Washington and Ankara, including the purchase of the Russian defence system S-400 and the Turkish activities in the Eastern Mediterranean region. Three days after its approval by the US Congress, the Donald Trump administration imposed the sanctions as part of the CAATSA. According to Senator Robert Menendez, a member of the United States Senate Committee on Foreign Relations and rapporteur of the NDAA amendment for US sanctions, Turkey's behavior in the East Med was one of the reasons contributing to the decision. The European Union's 27 leaders, also decided in the 10 December summit to impose sanctions on Turkey for its activities against Greece and Cyprus in the East Med. The EU sanctions include travel bans into the EU territories and asset freezes on Turkish companies and individuals.

On 18 September 2021, new diplomatic tensions sparked after an incident between Greece and Turkey where the latter's frigates prevented France's research vessel Nautical Geo from conducting surveys on Greece's behalf at the Greek EEZ, just 6 miles off the Greek island of Crete, whose waters Turkey claims as Turkish, citing its contentious maritime deal with the former Government of National Accord of Libya. The tensions come just a day after a high-level EUMed 9 Summit at Athens, where the heads of governments from 9 Mediterranean countries, including Croatia, Cyprus, France, Greece, Italy, Malta, Portugal, Slovenia and Spain, as well as the head of EU's Commission, Ursula von der Leyen, released a joint statement regarding the security and stability in the Mediterranean Sea, urging Turkey to "abstain, in a consistent and permanent manner, from provocations or unilateral actions in breach of international law". Turkey's Foreign Ministry rejected the summit's declaration, calling it "biased".

On 19 September, the main opposition party in Turkey, the Republican People's Party (CHP), opposed the Mavi Vatan (Blue Homeland) doctrine as aggressive and expansionist.

=== 2021: France–Greece and US–Greece defense pacts ===
On 28 September 2021, Greece and France signed the Franco-Greek defense agreement whereby either country is obliged to defend the other in the case of attack by a third party. France will supply Greece with navy frigates worth around €3 billion and is committed to help defend Greece if Turkey attacks. The pact is considered to be a landmark and the first of its kind ever signed between NATO allies, and is believed to be the first step in Europe's strategic autonomy and the creation of a European army. The deal was welcomed positively by other NATO allies such as the United States Germany, and the EU's Commission, however it is opposed by Turkey as "harmful". According to experts, the deal aims to become the basis for the creation of a European defense structure with its own autonomous dynamics and priorities, and part of Greece's efforts in deterring Turkey's neo-Ottoman expansionist policies in the region.

On 14 October, Greece and the United States expanded and indefinitely extended their defense pact amid tensions with Turkey. The agreement, known as the US-Greece Mutual Defense Cooperation Agreement, promotes a strategic partnership between the two countries and grants the American forces a broader use of Greek bases, including a military base near the Greece-Turkey border. According to the US Secretary of State Antony Blinken, it aims at advancing "security and stability in the Eastern Mediterranean and beyond". Furthermore, in his letter accompanying the deal, Blinken vowed "to mutually safeguard and protect the sovereignty and territorial integrity of both countries against actions threatening peace, including armed attacks".

On 15 December 2021, Turkey's Foreign Minister Mevlüt Çavuşoğlu hinged Greece's sovereignty over the Aegean islands to their demilitarized status, claiming for the first time that Greece loses its sovereign rights even over the major Greek islands (such as Chios, Lesvos, and Rhodes), from the moment it has militarized them. According to him, this claim of sovereignty over islands being dependent to their demilitarization, was reiterated in Turkey's October 2021 letter to the United Nations as well. The international community however rejected Çavuşoğlu's positions. The Israeli ambassador to Athens, Yossi Amrani, when commenting about Çavuşoğlu's statements, pointed to the joint Israel, Cyprus and Greece declaration at the tripartite Jerusalem Summit earlier this month, which stressed the need for all countries to respect the sovereign rights of their neighbors in the region. Besides Israel and Cyprus, also the United States, the United Kingdom, France, Germany, Ireland, the European Union, Egypt and China lend their support to Greece, with the State Department stating that "the sovereignty and territorial integrity of all countries must be respected and protected. The sovereignty of Greece οn these islands is not in question," and the European Union expressing its disapproval, stating that "the sovereignty of Greece in these islands is indisputable" and that "the international agreements must be respected." The US ambassador to Athens Geoffrey Pyatt also affirmed his country's solidarity with Greece against the Turkish claims. A few days later, however, the Turkish President Erdogan, reiterated Çavuşoğlu's statements, insisting that their militarization is a "violation of [international] treaties" and that "the issue of the islands is always controversial". Greece's Foreign Minister Nikos Dendias expressed his regret for Erdogan's remarks, stating that they go against the spirit of the United Nations's Universal Declaration of Human Rights (UDHR) and raises questions about Turkey's membership in the North Atlantic Alliance (NATO). Turkey's retired ambassadors, Yalım Eralp and Selim Kuneralp, questioned their country's foreign policy regarding the Greek islands, noting that it is harmful for its own interests. While commenting on the Turkish government's attempts to challenge their sovereignty, Eralp stated that "There are many claims of sovereignty that the islands were given on condition [of demilitarization]. There is no such thing. The islands located beyond three miles were given to Greece and Turkey has accepted it for many years. Putting this into question now – in diplomacy – makes Turkey an aggressive state", adding that "there are over 2,400 islands and islets in the Mediterranean. A treaty to count all these islands is out of the question. We have not seen it [happening] anywhere. [The Treaty of] Lausanne gave the islands beyond three miles to Greece, whether we like it or not."

On 9 July 2022, officials from Turkey's AKP-led ruling coalition, the People's Alliance, appeared for the first time in photographs with a revisionist map claiming Greece's largest island, Crete, as belonging to Turkey. Besides Crete, the entire eastern half of the Aegean Sea, its islands and their waters, which were initially claimed as part of the "Blue Homeland" doctrine, are also shown as Turkish. This prompted strong reactions and condemnation both in Greece and abroad, with Athens regarding the unprecedented move as an aggressive act, and the Greek Prime Minister asking publicly the Turkish President to clarify his position on the new map, something he avoided doing. The United States and Germany also rebuked the map's claims as unacceptable. Following these developments, the head of the US Senate Committee on Foreign Relations, Senator Robert Menendez, announced congressional amendments conditioning future US arm sales of F-16 to Turkey on its respect of Greek sovereignty. These amendments which require that the US administration shows the US Congress that Turkey has "not violated the sovereignty of Greece" in the past 120 days prior to the sale, and that concrete steps have been taken "to ensure no such F-16s are used by Turkey for repeated unauthorized territorial overflights of Greece", passed on 14 July.

On August 23, Turkey's Defense Ministry claimed that Greek Air Force fighter jets placed radar locks on Turkish F-16s escorting US B-52 bombers as part of the NATO mission. Following the incident, Turkey summoned the Greek military attaché and filed a complaint with NATO. A few days later, it also claimed that the radar of a Greek S-300 missile system based on the island of Crete has been used to locked on to the Turkish F-16s. These allegations were denied by Greece, while a Western military official noted that Turkey has yet to provide any evidence to support them. According to experts, it is believed that Turkey uses fake news regarding the use of S-300 by Greece to create analogies between Turkey's S-400 and Greece's S-300 in a bid to convince the US administration to lift the Countering America's Adversaries Through Sanctions Act (CAATSA) sanctions which were imposed on Turkey for acquiring them from Russia. However the United States refuted Turkey's attempts to create any analogies between its S-400 and Greece's S-300. In the past, Turkey has again unsuccessfully attempted to justify the use of S-400 and thus lift the CAATSA sanctions on Ankara, by pointing again to Greece's S-300.

=== September 2022: Threat of invasion ===
By 3 September 2022, Turkey's President Recep Tayyip Erdoğan threatened Greece with a Turkish military invasion of the Greek islands which, according to him, are "occupied". (Note: See:) Greece responded by reiterating its right to defend its islands against what it described as an "expansionist" Turkish stance, and pointed to Turkey's Aegean coast just opposite the Greek islands, noting that Turkey maintains there its landing fleet, the largest in Europe, along with a full formation of its army. Greece furthermore announced that it is informing the United Nations and NATO about the leader's remarks. The European Union and its presiding country, the Czech Republic condemned Erdoğan's threats as "unacceptable", while France's Foreign Minister Catherine Colonna responded by recalling the mutual assistance clause signed last year that unites Paris and Athens. According to the international media, the Turkish leader's remarks constituted an escalation of his rhetoric as he was preparing for the 2023 elections in his country, which are seen as crucial for his nearly 20-year rule; increasing the political rhetoric against a neighboring country would rally his nationalist base amid Turkey's ongoing economic troubles. According to Greek analysts, these threats of invasion made Greece's position appear more credible to the international community as the need to maintain a military presence on its islands for deterrence against Turkey is now fully justifiable.

On 11 December, Erdogan also stated that the Turkish-manufactured Tayfun missiles "will hit Athens", Greece's capital city, if the Greek islands continue to be armed up.

=== 2023–2025: Revival of "earthquake diplomacy" and suspension of projects ===
On 10 January 2023, the Court of Appeals of Tripoli suspended an energy exploration deal signed a few months earlier, on 3 October 2022, between Turkey and Libya's Government of National Unity (GNU) which is based at Tripoli. The agreement had included scope for oil and gas exploitation in waters that Ankara and Tripoli have claimed as their own through the 2019 Turkey–GNA maritime agreement, which partially overlaps with waters claimed by Egypt and Greece as part of their 2020 EEZ agreement.

In February 2023, south-central Turkey was hit by devastating earthquakes, to which Greece responded immediately by sending quake-relief aid. The newspaper Süddeutsche Zeitung noted that the Greek aid came despite severe diplomatic tensions in recent months, and Erdoğan's repeated threats to militarily invade Greece's islands. According to Deutsche Welle, these developments marked the revival of the Greek–Turkish earthquake diplomacy of 1999 between the two countries, once again. This improvement in the bilateral relations, resulted in the cessation of Turkey's practice of military overflights above Greece's territories and the violations of its national airspace, ever since.

In December 2023, Turkish President Erdoğan visited Athens for talks with Greek PM Mitsotakis. This was the first visit in 6 years and the talks were held in a positive atmosphere and considered a success after recent bad relations. No major disputes were resolved, however, the two leaders signed a non-binding declaration of friendship, and numerous bilateral agreements; including managing migration flows, and committed to continuing talks in Ankara in the spring of 2024.

Tensions were raised again in July 2024, when five Turkish warships put pressure on research vessels near Karpathos for the laying of undersea power cables linking Greece with Cyprus and Israel. The tension was diffused when the research vessels withdrew. In March 2025, the Greek government paused the planned Great Sea Interconnector mainly due to Turkey's objections. This follows the cancellation of the EastMed Gas pipeline, which was also meant to connect Greece and Cyprus with Israel and Egypt through the disputed waters.

== Status of islands ==
Islands by date of accession to Greece

Islands by demilitarization status

There have been a number of disputes related to the territories of the Greek islands themselves. These have related to the demilitarized status of some of the main islands in the area; to Turkish concerns over alleged endeavours by Greece to artificially expand settlements to previously uninhabited islets; and to the existence of alleged "grey zones", an undetermined number of small islands of undetermined sovereignty.

=== Demilitarized status ===
The question of the demilitarized status of some major Greek islands is complicated by a number of facts. Several of the Greek islands in the eastern Aegean as well as the Turkish straits region were placed under various regimes of demilitarization in different international treaties. The regimes developed over time, resulting in difficulties of treaty-interpretation. However, the military status of the islands in question did not constitute a serious problem in the bilateral relations until the Cyprus crisis of 1974, after which both Greece and Turkey re-interpreted the stipulations of the treaties. Greece, claiming an inalienable right to defend itself against Turkish aggression, reinforced its military and National Guard forces in the region. Furthermore, Greece maintains the position that it has the right to militarize its islands in the same context as the rest of Europe, where the appliance of demilitarization statute on islands and territories ceased with the creation of the North Atlantic Treaty Organization and the Warsaw Pact; i.e. the cessation of demilitarization of Italy's Panteleria, Lampedusa, Lampione and Linosa islands, and West Germany from the NATO side, and the cessation of demilitarization of Bulgaria, Romania, East Germany, and Hungary from the Warsaw Pact's side, and the cessation of demilitarization of Finland. Turkey, on the other hand, denounces this as an aggressive act by Greece and as a breach of international treaties. From a legal perspective, three groups of islands may be distinguished: (a) the islands right off the Turkish Dardanelles straits, i.e. Lemnos and Samothrace; (b) the Dodecanese islands in the southeast Aegean; and (c) the remaining northeast Aegean islands (Lesbos, Chios, Samos, and Ikaria).

==== Lemnos and Samothrace ====
These islands were placed under a demilitarization statute by the Treaty of Lausanne in 1923, to counterbalance the simultaneous demilitarization of the Turkish straits area (the Dardanelles and Bosphorus), Imbros and Tenedos. The demilitarization on the Turkish side was later abolished through the Montreux Convention Regarding the Regime of the Turkish Straits in 1936. Greece holds that, by superseding the relevant sections of the earlier treaty, the convention simultaneously lifted also the Greek obligations with respect to these islands. Against this, Turkey argues that the Montreux treaty did not mention the islands and has not changed their status. Greece, on the other hand, cites Turkish official declarations, by the then Turkish Minister for Foreign Affairs, Rustu Aras, to that effect made in 1936, assuring the Greek side that Turkey would consider the Greek obligations lifted.

==== Dodecanese ====
These islands were placed under a demilitarization statute after the Second World War by the Treaty of peace with Italy (1947), when Italy ceded them to Greece. Italy had previously not been under any obligation towards Turkey in this respect. Turkey, in turn, was not a party to the 1947 treaty, having been neutral during WWII. Greece therefore holds that the obligations it incurred towards Italy and the other parties in 1947 are res inter alios acta for Turkey in the sense of Article 34 of the Vienna Convention on the Law of Treaties, which states that a treaty does not create obligations or rights for a third country, and that Turkey thus cannot base any claims on them. Turkey argues that the demilitarization agreement constitutes a status treaty (an objective régime), where according to general rules of treaty law such an exclusion does not hold.

==== Lesbos, Chios, Samos, and Ikaria ====
The remaining islands (Lesbos, Chios, Samos, and Ikaria) were placed under a partial demilitarization statute by the Treaty of Lausanne in 1923. It prohibited the establishment of naval bases and fortifications, but allowed Greece to maintain a limited military contingent recruited from the local population, as well as police forces. With respect to these islands, Greece has not claimed that the treaty obligations have been formally superseded. However, in recent years it has argued that it is entitled to discount them, invoking Article 51 of the Charter of the United Nations. It argues that after the Turkish occupation of northern Cyprus and the Turkish threat of war over the 12 miles issue, re-armament is an act of legitimate self-defence.

=== "Grey zones" ===
==== Imia ====
Position of Imia

The first time a dispute between the two countries in the Aegean touched on questions of actual sovereignty over territories was in early 1996 at the tiny barren islets of Imia (known as Kardak in Turkey), situated between the Dodecanese island chain and the Turkish mainland. The conflict, triggered by the stranding of a Turkish merchant ship on the islets, was originally caused by factual inconsistencies between maps of the area, some of which assigned these islets to Greece, others to Turkey. The media of the two countries took up the issue and gave it a nationalistic turn, before the two governments even had the time to come to a full technical understanding of the true legal and geographical situation. Both governments finally adopted an intransigent stance, publicly asserting their own claims of sovereignty over the islets. The result was military escalation, which was perceived abroad as quite out of proportion with the size and significance of the rocks in question. The two countries were at the brink of war for a few days, until the crisis was defused with the help of foreign mediation.

During the crisis and in the months following it, both governments elaborated legal arguments to support their claims to sovereignty. The arguments exchanged concerned the interpretation of the Treaty of Lausanne of 1923, which forms the principal basis for the legal status of territories in most of the region, as well as certain later diplomatic dealings between Turkey, Greece and Italy.

==== Other "grey zones" ====
In the wake of the Imia crisis, the Turkish government widened its argumentation to include not only Imia but also a possibly large number of other islands and small formations across the Aegean. Since then, Turkish authorities have spoken of "grey zones" of undetermined sovereignty. According to the Turkish argument, these islets, while not explicitly retained under Turkish sovereignty in 1923, were also not explicitly ceded to any other country, and their sovereignty has therefore remained objectively undecided.

The Turkish government has avoided stating exactly which islets it wishes to include in this category. On various occasions, Turkish government sources have indicated that islands such as Pserimos, Agathonisi, Fournoi and Gavdos (situated south of Crete) might be included. Most of them, unlike Imia, had undeniably been in factual Greek possession, which had never previously been challenged by Turkey, and all but the final two listed below have Greek residents and infrastructure. Furthermore, the islands are covered by previous treaties such as the Treaty of Lausanne, which defines Turkish sovereignty as limited to within 3 miles of the Anatolian mainland in the majority of cases. In a 2004 publication by Turkish authors close to the Turkish military leadership the following (among other, even smaller ones) were listed as potentially "grey" areas:

- Oinousses (between Chios and the Turkish coast),
- Antipsara (west of the islands of Psara and Khios),
- Fournoi,
- Arkoi,
- Agathonisi (Gaidaros),
- Pharmakonisi,
- Kalolimnos (near Imia),
- Pserimos,
- Gyali (between Kos and Nisyros),
- Syrna (SE of Astypalaia)
- Kandheliousa (south of Kos),
- Kalogeroi (islets) (small rocks 41 km northeast of Andros)

=== Military overflights over Greek territory ===
While Turkey has not attempted to challenge Greek sovereignty on the ground, its claims about "grey area" islands add to the number of minor military incidents, already numerous due to the 10-mile airspace and the FIR issues. Greek authorities routinely report that the Turkish Air Force ignores their national airspace. According to Greek press reports, the number of airspace violations rose sharply in 2006, as did the number of unauthorized Turkish military flights directly over Greek islands themselves. Renewed reports of systematic Turkish military flights directly over Greek islands like Pharmakonisi and Agathonisi were made in late 2008 and early 2009.

During the late 2010s, tensions rose again as Turkish fighter aircraft increased the number of direct armed overflights above inhabited Greek islands. While most overflights continue to occur above small islands that Turkey considers "grey areas", such as Agathonisi or Oinousses, some incidents have also repeatedly been reported involving major and undisputed islands such as Rhodes, Lesbos, Chios or Leros. Flying over the territory of a country is considered a serious violation of its sovereignty and one of the most provocative acts by Turkey, directly challenging Greek territorial sovereignty.

In 2020, Turkish fighter aircraft also begun overflights above the Greek mainland, on Evros.

A regional Foreign Minister conference held on 11 May 2020 with the participation of Cyprus, Egypt, France, Greece and the United Arab Emirates, concluded with a joint declaration condemning Turkey for its practice of conducting armed overflights above the inhabited Greek islands.

In 2022, Turkish bomber aircraft approached the major Greek city of Alexandroupolis on Evros, within 2.5 miles. The jets reportedly flew near the US base located in the city's port. This move is considered to be unprecedented, prompting protests from both the Greek authorities and the European Union, as well as USA's disapproval, with the Head of Turkey's Permanent Representation to the European Union Mehmet Bozay being summoned at Brussels by the Secretary General of the European Union External Action Service, Stefano Sannino.

== Turkish incidents with Frontex ==
In September 2009, a Turkish military radar issued a warning to a Latvian helicopter patrolling in the eastern Aegean—part of the EU's Frontex programme to combat illegal immigration—to leave the area. The Turkish General Staff reported that the Latvian Frontex aircraft had violated Turkish airspace west of Didim. According to a Hellenic Air Force announcement, the incident occurred as the Frontex helicopter—identified as an Italian-made Agusta A109—was patrolling in Greek air space near the small isle of Farmakonisi, which lies on a favorite route used by migrant smugglers ferrying mostly illegal migrants into Greece and the EU from the opposite Turkish coastline. Frontex officials stated that they simply ignored the Turkish warnings as they did not recognise their being in Turkish airspace and continued their duties.

Another incident took place in October 2009 in the aerial area above the eastern Aegean sea, off the island of Lesbos. On 20 November 2009, the Turkish General Staff issued a press note alleging that an Estonian Border Guard aircraft Let L-410 UVP taking off from Kos on a Frontex mission had violated Turkish airspace west of Söke.

== Strategies of conflict resolution ==
The decades since the 1970s have seen a repeated heightening and abating of political and military tensions over the Aegean. Thus, the crisis of 1987 was followed by a series of negotiations and agreements in Davos and Brussels in 1988. Again, after the Imia crisis of 1996, there came an agreement over peaceful neighbourly relations reached at a meeting in Madrid in 1997. The period since about 1999 has been marked by a steady improvement of bilateral relations.

For years, the Aegean dispute has been a matter not only about conflicting claims of substance. Rather, proposed strategies of how to resolve the substantial differences have themselves constituted a matter of heated dispute. Whereas Turkey has traditionally preferred to regard the whole set of topics as a political issue, requiring bilateral political negotiation, Greece views them as separate and purely legal issues, requiring only the application of existing principles of international law. Turkey has advocated direct negotiation, with a view to establishing what it would regard as an equitable compromise. Greece refuses to accept any process that would put it under pressure to engage in a give-and-take over what it perceives as inalienable and unnegotiable sovereign rights. Up to the late 1990s, the only avenue of conflict resolution that Greece deemed acceptable was to submit the issues separately to the International Court of Justice in The Hague.

The resulting stalemate between both sides over process was partially changed after 1999, when the European summit of Helsinki opened up a path towards Turkey's accession to the EU. In the summit agreement, Turkey accepted an obligation to solve its bilateral disputes with Greece before actual accession talks would start. This was perceived as giving Greece a new tactical advantage over Turkey in determining which paths of conflict resolution to choose. During the following years, both countries held regular bilateral talks on the level of technical specialists, trying to determine possible future procedures. According to press reports, both sides seemed close to an agreement about how to submit the dispute to the court at The Hague, a step which would have fulfilled many of the old demands of Greece. However, a newly elected Greek government under Kostas Karamanlis, soon after it took office in March 2004, opted out of this plan, because Ankara was insisting that all the issues, including Imia and the "grey zones", belonged to a single negotiating item. Athens saw them as separate. However, Greek policy remained at the forefront in advocating closer links between Ankara and the EU. This resulted in the European Union finally opening accession talks with Turkey without its previous demands having been fulfilled.

According to some commentators, the 2020 fall of energy prices, combined with the discovery of gas within the Turkish EEZ in the Black Sea means there is enough energy in Turkey that further exploration for gas is unnecessary.

According to Greece's Foreign Minister Nikos Dendias, the disputes which are plaguing the Greek-Turkish relations for decades, can easily be resolved once Turkey accepts the United Nations Convention on the Law of the Sea (UNCLOS). To this, Dendias opined that the United States, due to their position and influence in the region, are an "ideal partner" in persuading Turkey to do so. Furthermore, he noted that the UNCLOS has been ratified by all the member states of the European Union, is part of the EU's acquis communautaire, and therefore Greece's talks with EU-candidate member Turkey on the delimitation of maritime zones are bound by it. Ronald Meinardus, head of the Friedrich Naumann Foundation, analyst and author in Deutsche Welle, while commenting on the statements Dendias made during his official visit to Ankara in April 2021 about the UNCLOS being a prerequisite for joining the EU, confirmed that the Law of the Sea is a precondition for Turkey's EU membership.

In July 2025, Greece announced its intention to deploy autonomous military units on its Aegean islands. These units are planned to operate independently, generating their own food, water, and energy, and functioning without direct central command or resupply, as part of Greece's broader "Agenda 2030" defense modernization strategy.

== See also ==
- Cyprus problem
- Cyprus–Turkey maritime zones dispute
- Exclusive economic zone of Greece
- Foreign relations of Greece
- Foreign relations of Turkey
- Imia
- Libya (GNA)–Turkey maritime deal
