= R.550 Magic =

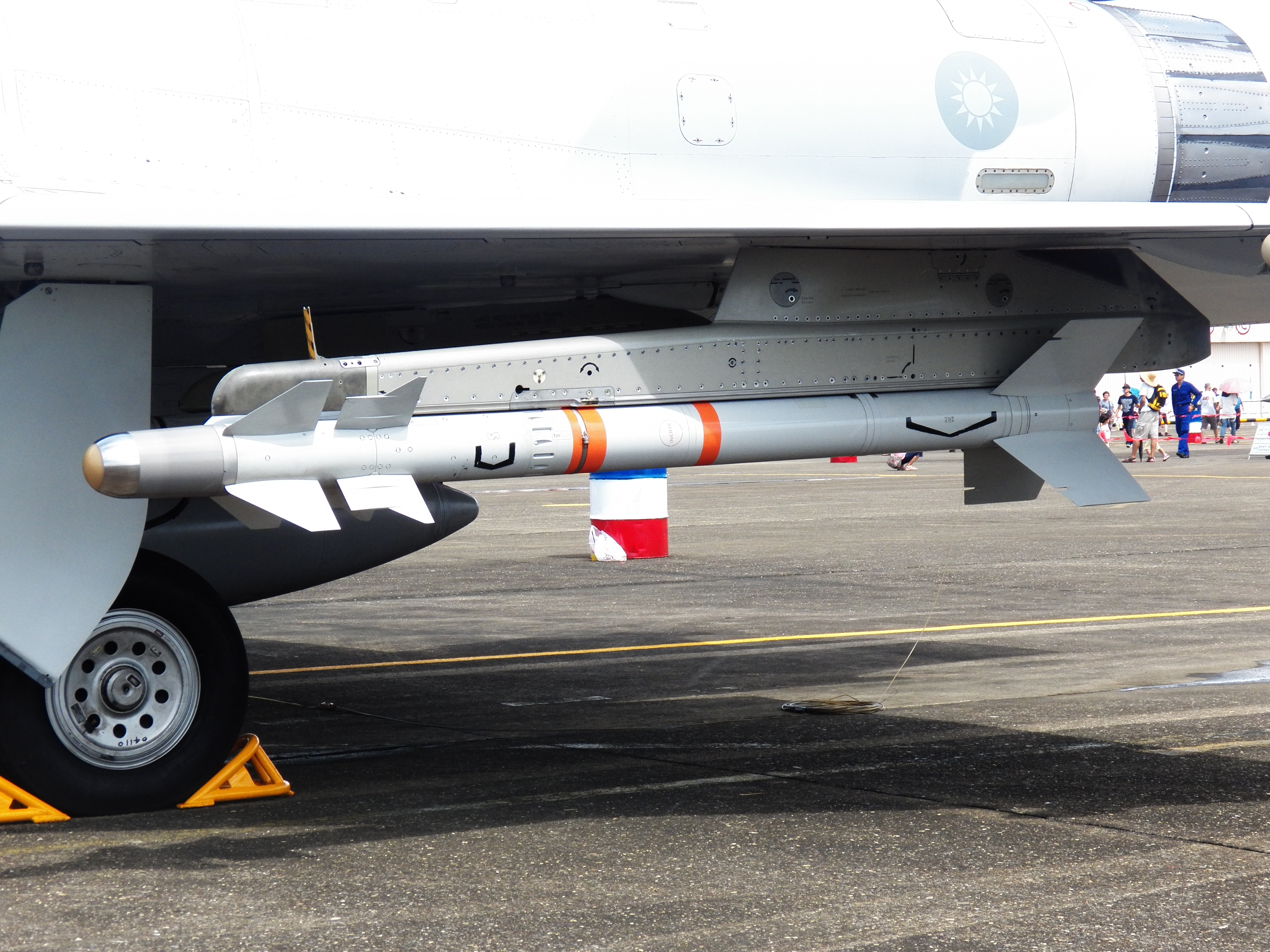
- R.550 Magic loaded on the pylon of a ROCAF Mirage 2000-5EI.
- Type: Short-range air-to-air missile
- Place of origin: France

Service history
- In service: 1968 (Magic) and 1986 (Magic 2)
- Used by: See Operators
- Wars: South African Border War; Iran-Iraq War

Production history
- Manufacturer: Matra, MBDA France
- Unit cost: $38 000 - $90 000 (USD)

Specifications
- Mass: 89 kg (196 lb)
- Length: 2.72 m (8 ft 11 in)
- Height: 2.75 Meters
- Diameter: 157 mm (6 in)
- Wingspan: 0.66 Metres
- Warhead: High explosive pre-fragmented 12.7 kg (28 lb) warhead
- Detonation mechanism: Contact and RF proximity fuzing
- Engine: Richard single-stage butylene solid-propellant rocket
- Propellant: Solid fuel
- Operational range: 10 km (6 mi) (Magic 1); 20 km (12 mi) (Magic 2)
- Flight ceiling: 18,000 m (59,000 ft)
- Maximum speed: Mach 3 (Magic 1); Mach 2 (Magic 2)
- Guidance system: Infrared homing
- Launch platform: British Aerospace Sea Harrier FRS.51, Dassault Étendard IV, Dassault Mirage III, Dassault Mirage 5, Dassault Mirage F1, Dassault Mirage 2000, Dassault Super Étendard, Dassault Rafale, General Dynamics F-16, Mikoyan-Gurevich MiG-21 LanceR, SEPECAT Jaguar, Vought F-8E(FN) Crusader.

The R.550 Magic (backronym for Missile Auto-Guidé Interception et Combat) is a short-range air-to-air missile designed in 1965 by French company Matra to compete with the American AIM-9 Sidewinder, and it was made backwards compatible with the Sidewinder launch hardware.

== Development ==
Developed originally as a short-range infrared air-to-air missile, the R.550 was meant to be France's lighter short-range missile, replacing the previous heavy R.530. During a trial on 11 January 1965, a Gloster Meteor of the centre for in-flight trials fired an R.550 Magic and shot down a Nord CT20 target drone.

The Magic was then mass-produced from 1967 and was adopted by the French Air Force and Navy for active service. During tests with Indian MiG-21s, six Magic-1 missiles all score hits on Chukar target drones.

An upgraded version, the Magic 2, replaced the original model in 1986. In total, 11,300 Magics (7,000 Magic 1s and 4,000 Magic 2s) were produced; they were exported, notably to Iraq and Greece, who used them in combat.

The Magic has been used by the Dassault Rafale, Dassault Mirage 2000, F-16, Sea Harrier (FRS51), MiG-21, Super Étendard, Mirage F1, Mirage 5, and Mirage III. However, it is gradually being replaced by the MBDA MICA. 480 Magics were sold to Taiwan and are used by the Republic of China Air Force's Mirage 2000s.

The PL-7 is the Chinese reversed-engineered version of the R.550 Magic 1.

== Description ==
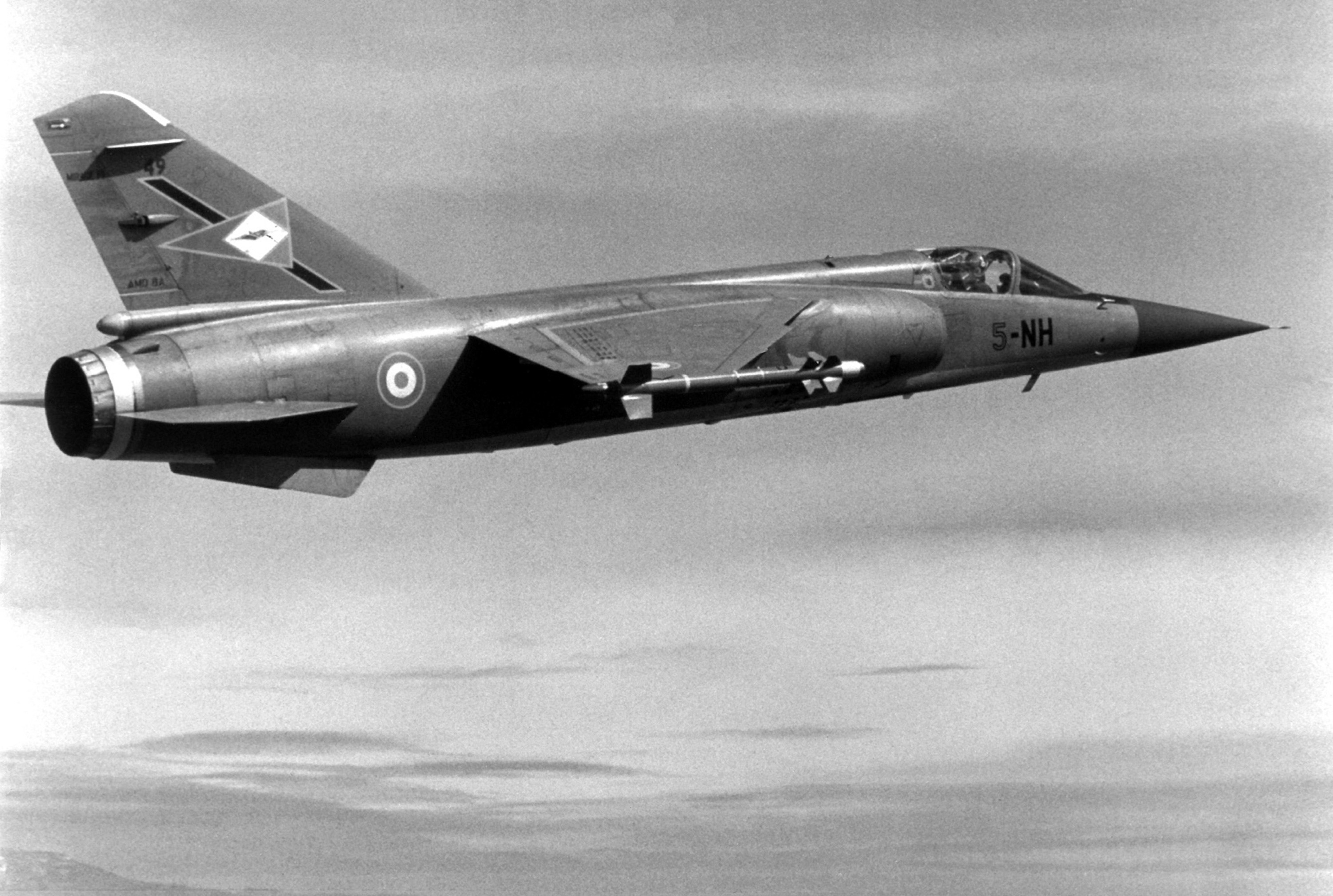
A Mirage F1C of Escadron de chasse 1/5 Vendée with a R.550 Magic on the wingtip hardpoint, 1985.

The Magic has four fixed fins, four movable fins directly behind the fixed fins, and four notched fins on the tail. As the canards move to guide the missile to the target, small vortices generated by the canards impart roll moments on the tail fins, which can slow the roll attempted by the missile, or even roll reversal. To prevent interfering moments from the tail, the fins are mounted on bearings allowing the tail fins to spin freely. This is in contrast with the AIM-9, which makes use of "rollerons," which are slipstream-driven gyros mounted on the tail fins which stabilize the missile in three axes, and have no fixed fin "canards" forward of the moving fins. Its diameter is larger than the Sidewinder's, which is 5 inches (127 mm) and a legacy of the US Navy's five-inch rocket, from which the AIM-9 is derived; the larger diameter simplified engineering. It has a Romeo solid-fuel engine, and can engage the target independently from the firing aircraft with its all-aspect cooled infrared homing system. The homing system utilizes lead sulfide, granting it a high sensitivity and immunity to noise, or thermal clutter. The missile can attain track through information transmitted (prior to launch) by the aircraft's radar system, helmet mounted target designation system, optoelectronic sighting system, or through merely being pointed at the target and then being uncaged (allowing the seeker head to move freely on the gimbal onboard the missile).

The missile has no minimum launch speed, making it a prime candidate for arming helicopters which often fly at significantly lower speeds than fighter fixed-wing platforms. It utilizes a silver-zinc battery to power its electronics.

The missile features a 13kg pre-fragmented controlled splinter warhead which makes up 14.6% of the missile's total weight, and uses a proximity fuse for detonation. The warhead is armed 1.8 seconds after launch, making its minimum WEZ (Weapon Employment Zone) 0.3 kilometers (0.18 miles). It utilizes a Richard single-stage butylene solid-propellant rocket for propulsion, propelling it to speeds up to Mach 3 for the Magic 1, and Mach 2 for the Magic 2. The missile can be outfitted on any aircraft capable of firing the AIM-9 Sidewinder. If the missile misses, it self-destructs after 26 seconds.

While the missile was satisfactory as a dogfight missile in the 1980s, it is outdated by today's standards. The Magic 2 replaced the AD3601 seeker head by the all-aspect AD3633, allowing all-aspect capability (the Magic 1 can only be fired from the rear on the target). The Magic 1 has a transparent dome on its nose, while the Magic 2 is opaque. The Magic 2 also had a reduced amount of time required for the weapon to be prepared for launch. The seeker head has a gimbal limit of 30 degrees, meaning that it can track targets up to 30 degrees off of its boresight. Once launched, the R.550 Magic 1 is capable of withstanding 35g's, and the Magic 2 capable of 50g's.

== Operators ==
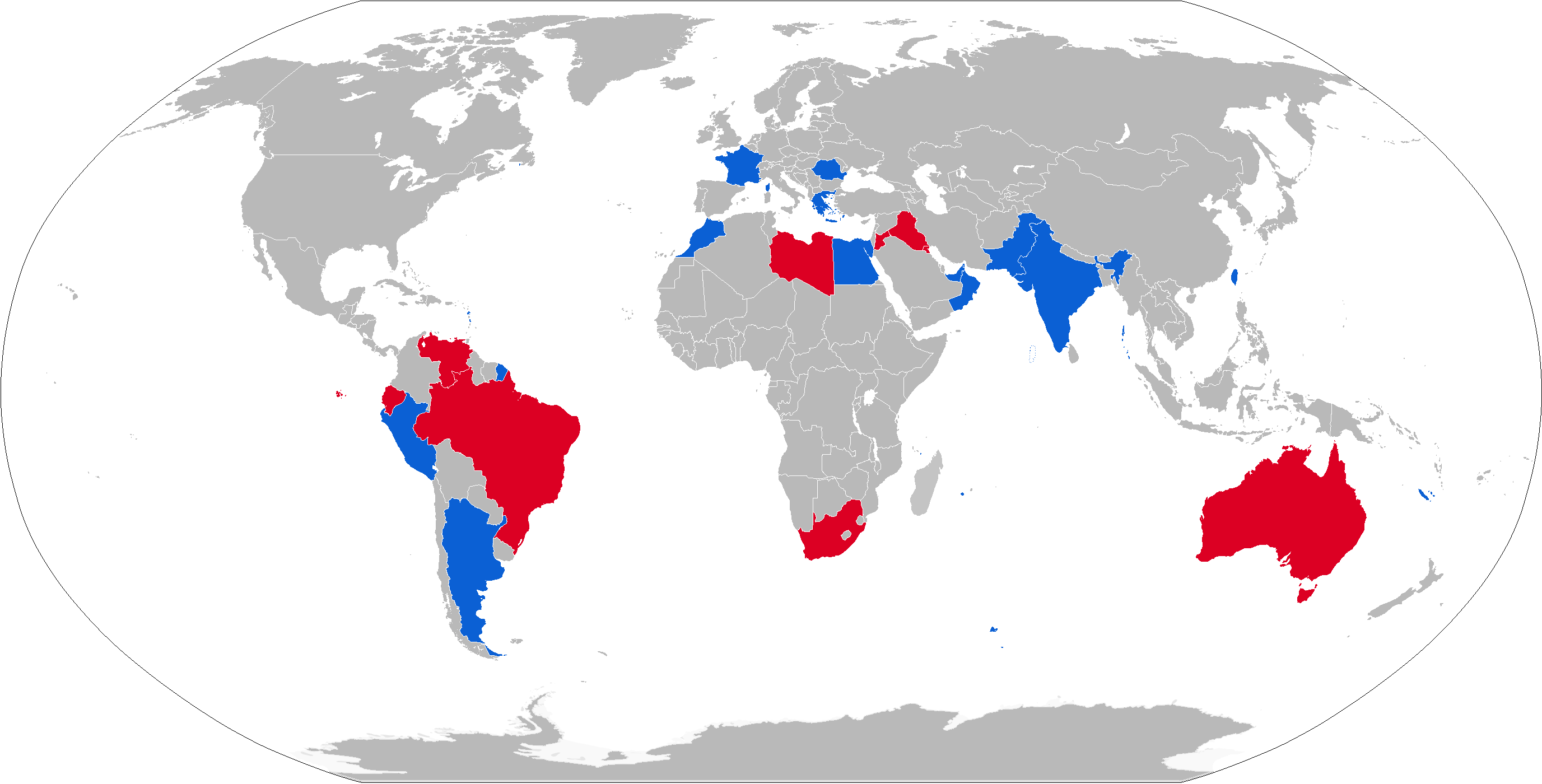
Operators: Current Former

=== Current operators ===
- Egypt
- France
- India
- Morocco
- Pakistan
- Peru: Magic 1 and 2 on Mirage 2000
- Taiwan
- United Arab Emirates
- Ukraine

=== Former operators ===
- Argentina: Magic 1 on the Mirage IIIEA, Dagger, Mirage 5P Mara and Super Étendard.
- Australia: Magic 1 on the Mirage IIIO.
- Brazil: Magic 2 on Mirage 2000B/C.
- Ecuador: Magic 2 on Mirage F1.
- Greece: Magic 2 on Mirage 2000EGM.
- Iraq: Magic 1 and 2 on Mirage F1.
- Jordan
- Kuwait: Magic 1 and 2 on Mirage F1.
- Libya
- Oman
- Romania: Magic 2 on MiG-21 LanceR.
- South Africa: Magic 1 on the Mirage F1.
- Venezuela: On the Mirage 50.

== Operational history ==
=== Greece ===
On 8 October 1996, 7 months after the escalation over Imia/Kardak a Greek Mirage 2000 fired an R550 Magic II and shot down a Turkish F-16D over the Aegean Sea. The Turkish pilot died, while the co-pilot ejected and was rescued by Greek forces. In August 2012, after the downing of a Turkish RF-4E on the Syrian Coast, in response to a parliamentary question, Turkish Defence Minister İsmet Yılmaz confirmed that Turkish F-16D Block 40 (s/n 91-0023) of 192 Filo was shot down by a Greek Mirage 2000 with an R.550 Magic II on 8 October 1996 in the disputed airspace near Chios island.

=== South Africa ===
The South African Air Force (SAAF) received a number of R.550 missiles before a widespread international arms embargo took effect in 1977. SAAF Mirage F1 aircraft carried the R.550. South African Mirage F1s fired early generation R550 missiles in combat over Angola against MiG-21 and MiG-23 adversaries on a number of occasions. In all but one case, the missiles failed to damage or destroy the MiGs. In an engagement between a Mirage F1CZ and MiG-21 in October 1982, two R.550s were fired by SAAF Major Rankin and one of them damaged the FAPLA MiG-21. The limited performance envelope of early generation R.550s led South Africa to begin developing an indigenous AAM called the V-3 Kukri.

== See also ==
- PL-7 Chinese version of R.550 Magic
- ASRAAM – (United Kingdom)
- IRIS-T – (Germany, Italy, Sweden, Greece)
- MICA – (France)
- List of missiles
