= Kalogeroi =

Group of islets in the Aegean Sea

Native name: Καλόγεροι
- Location within Greece

Geography
- Coordinates: 38.17°N 25.28°E
- Archipelago: North Aegean
- Area: 0.008 km^{2} (0.0031 sq mi)
- Highest elevation: 36.5 m (119.8 ft)

Administration
- Greece
- Region: North Aegean
- Regional unit: Chios

Kalogeroi (Greek: Καλόγεροι) are three small uninhabited Greek islets in the Aegean Sea. They have been known both as Kalogeroi of Andros and Kalogeroi of Chios. The islets are situated 24 nautical miles southwest from Antipsara. Administratively they belong to Psara.

For at least 200 years until the 1690s, the island was the site of a Christian monastery as attested by various travellers to the Aegean.

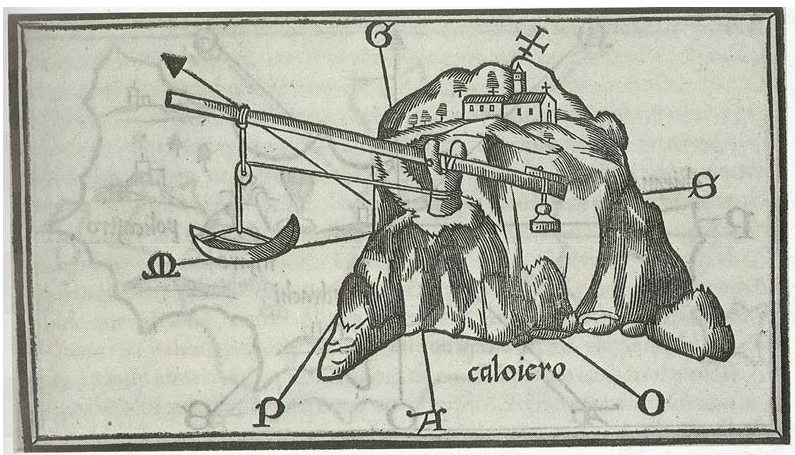
Depiction of the island by Benedetto Bordone, 1537
