= 1996 Turkish F-16 shootdown =

Greek shootdown of a Turkish plane

Shootdown
- Date: 8 October 1996
- Summary: Shot down by Hellenic Air Force Mirage-2000
- Site: Aegean Sea

Aircraft
- Aircraft type: General Dynamics F-16 Fighting Falcon
- Operator: Turkish Air Force
- Call sign: 192nd Squadron
- Registration: 91-0023
- Occupants: 2
- Crew: 2
- Fatalities: 1
- Survivors: 1

On 8 October 1996, seven months after the escalation of the Imia/Kardak crisis, a Greek Mirage 2000 reportedly fired an R.550 Magic II missile and shot down a Turkish F-16D over the Aegean Sea near Chios island. The Turkish pilot died, while the co-pilot ejected and was rescued by Greek forces. In August 2012, after the downing of a RF-4E on the Syrian Coast, Turkish Defense Minister İsmet Yılmaz confirmed that the Turkish F-16D was shot down by a Greek Mirage 2000 with an R.550 Magic II in 1996 after allegedly violating Greek airspace near Chios island. Greece denies that the F-16 was shot down. Both Mirage 2000 pilots reported that the F-16 caught fire and they saw one parachute.

== Background ==
Greece–Turkey relations have always been tense over the disputes in the Aegean Sea. For years, more frequently than not, HAF and TAF pilots have engaged in mock dogfights over the Aegean sea. Greece accuses Turkey of violating its airspace thousands of times over the past few decades. In multiple cases these mock dog fights have ended in deadly accidents with either side losing a fighter jet and at times their own pilots.

== Event ==
On the afternoon of October 8, 1996, 2 Turkish F-16s and 4 F-4s were on a SEAD training mission over the Aegean north of Chios. 2 Greek Dassault Mirage 2000 jets, one flown by captain Thanos Grivas were sent to intercept the Turkish jets. After being reported to refuse to leave alleged Greek airspace just north of Samos during the ensuing dog fight, a Turkish F-16 piloted by Captain Nail Erdoğan and his co pilot Lieutenant Colonel Osman Çiçekli was shot down by a R.550 Magic missile from Thanos Grivas's jet. The co-pilot, Lieutenant Colonel Osman Çiçekli survived by using his ejection seat but Captain Nail Erdoğan did not eject and was reported to have died in the crash. Turkish Navy, with help from Greece was conducting a detailed search activity where the plane was assumed to have crashed. Aydın class mine hunters M-266 TCG Amasra and M-268 TCG Akçakoca, and the salvage ship A-589 TCG Işın were searching for the wreck of the plane since 14 April 2014, while fast attack craft P-341 TCG Martı provided escort. The search eventually ended with the body of Nail Erdogan unable to be found. At first there were only rumors that the F-16 was shot down until, in 2003, a former Turkish naval commander confirmed that a Greek warplane had shot down a Turkish F-16 fighter in the Aegean in 1996. In 2012, after the downing of a Turkish RF-4E on the Syrian Coast, Turkish Defence Minister İsmet Yılmaz confirmed that the Turkish F-16D was shot down by a Greek Mirage 2000 with an R.550 Magic II in 1996.

== Aftermath ==
In 2014 Turkish prosecutors tried to seek the indictment of Greek officials over the 1996 crash of a Turkish F-16 warplane in the Aegean Sea. Greece had denied it being shot down and both Mirage pilots reported that the Turkish F-16 caught fire at random and only saw one parachute.
