= Res inter alios acta =

Doctrine in contract law

Res inter alios acta, aliis nec nocet nec prodest (Latin for "a thing done between some does not harm or benefit others") is a law doctrine which holds that a contract cannot adversely affect the rights of one who is not a party to the contract.

"Res inter alios" has a common meaning: "A matter between others is not our business."

== Civil and criminal law ==
The doctrine of res inter alios acta is a principle of fundamental justice, and therefore applies to Western law generally. This is because the doctrine includes (but is not limited to) acts done by others without the knowledge or consent of the person being accused or prejudiced.

== Contract Law ==
Many UK cases cite insurance contracts as being res inter alios acta. It seems to be in line with the "privity of contract" doctrine.

Case law: George E. Taylor & Co. v. Percy Trentham (1980)

Taylor were nominated subcontractors to Trentham. They also had a contract with the employer (collateral contract) whereby they warranted due performance of the subcontract works so that the main contractors should not become entitled to an extension of time. The employer paid Trentham only £7,526 against an interim certificate of £22,101. The amount withheld was the balance payable to the subcontractors after deduction of the main contractor's claim against them for delay. It was held that the employer was not entitled to withhold the money as the contract between the employer and the subcontractor was res inter alios acta.
