= Antipsara =

Greek island in the Aegean Sea

Native name: Αντίψαρα
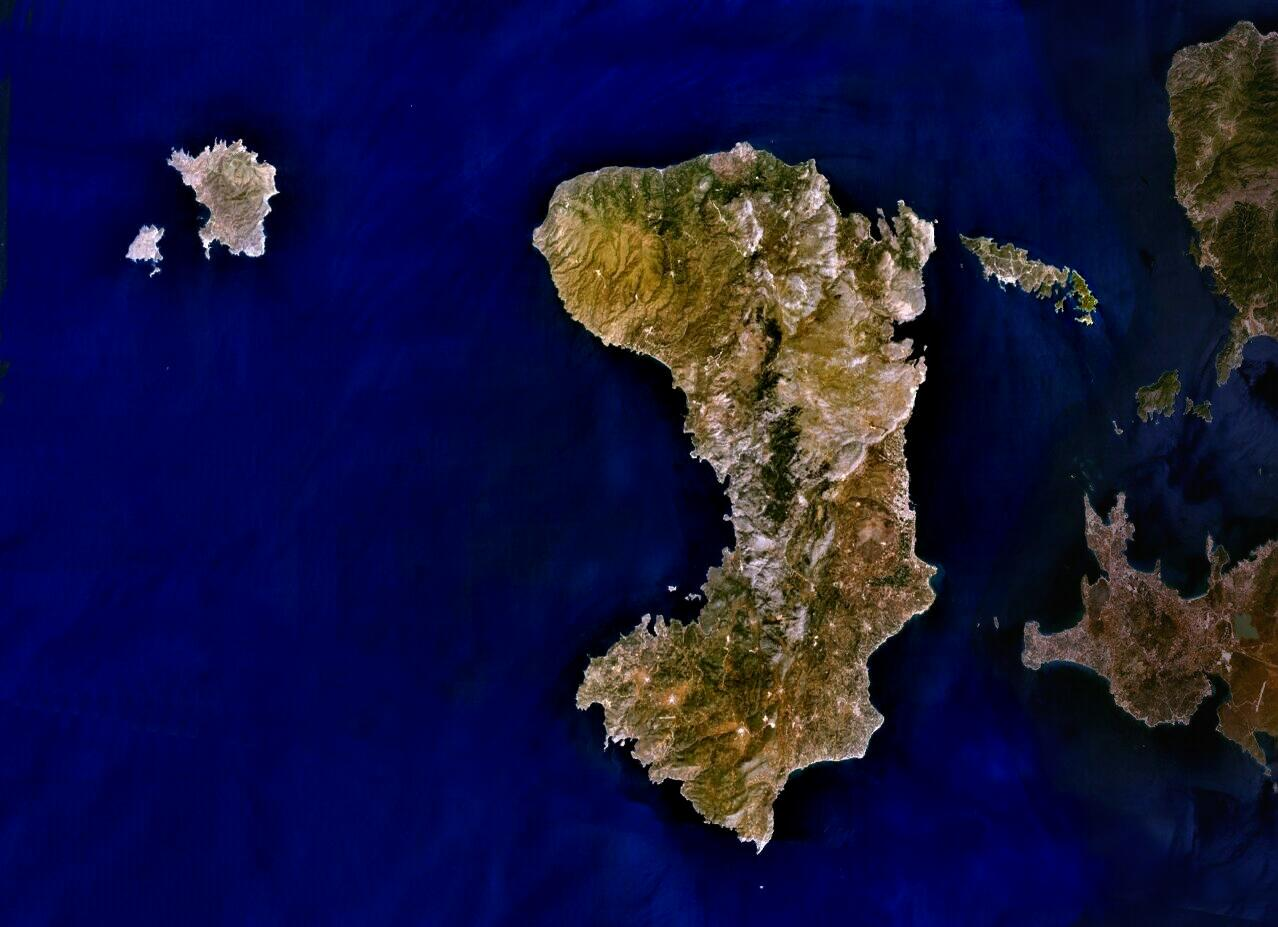
- Composite satellite image of Chios Prefecture; consisting of the islands of Chios (centre), of Psara and Antipsara (West and far west, respectively)

- Location within Greece

Geography
- Coordinates: 38.542°N 25.512°E
- Archipelago: North Aegean
- Total islands: 3
- Highest elevation: 130 m (430 ft)

Administration
- Greece
- Region: North Aegean
- Regional unit: Chios

Demographics
- Population: 0 (2021)

Antipsara (Greek: Αντίψαρα) is a small Greek island in the Aegean Sea. Antipsara had no permanent inhabitants, according to the 2021 census. It lies about 3 km (2 mi) west of the larger Psara island, from which its name is derived. Geographic conditions make it inaccessible from the north and west sides. Evidence exists of settlement in ancient Greek and Roman times. During Ottoman rule the island served as a port. Nowadays, tourist trips to the island originate from Psara in the summer months. The small church of St John (Άγιος Ιωάννης) on the eastern side is visited in August by pilgrims.

== Geography ==
Off its west coast are the smaller islands of Loulomi and Skokia.

== Wildlife ==
The island is a nesting site of the European shag (Phalacrocorax aristotelis), Eleonora's falcon (Falco eleonorae), Cory's shearwater (Calonectris diomedea), and the yelkouan shearwater (Puffinus yelkouan).

== Gallery ==
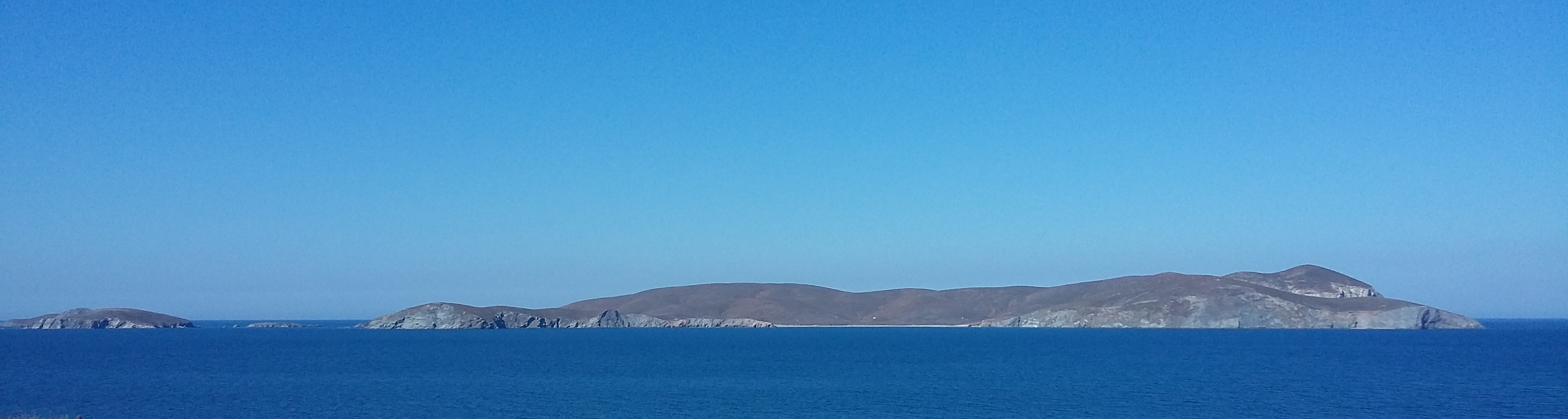
Antipsara as seen from Psara island

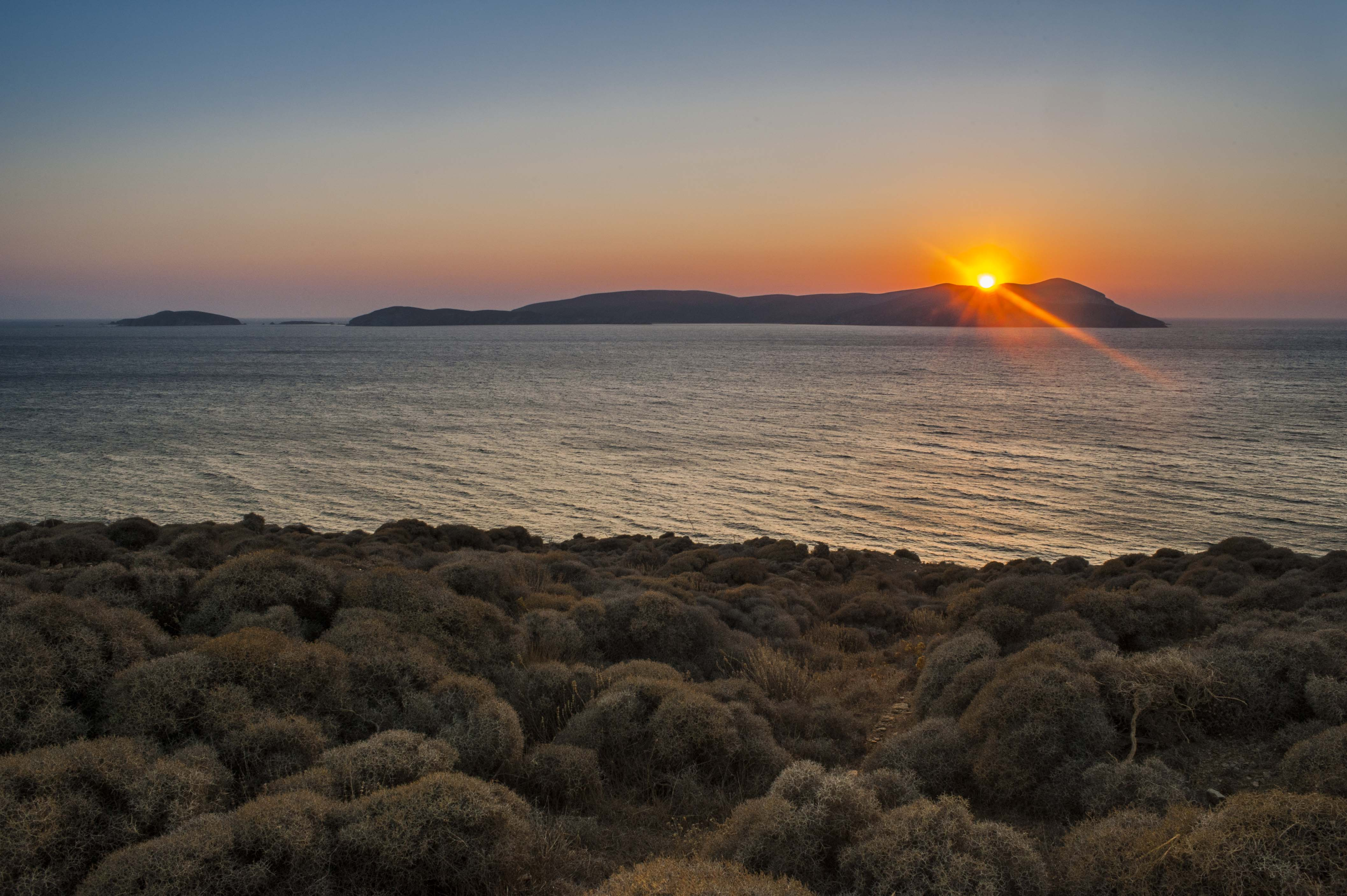
Antipsara sunset
